= 2020s in fashion =

The fashion of the 2020s represents a rejection of minimalistic 2010s fashion in favor of short-lived social-media trends and nostalgia for older aesthetics. It has been largely inspired by styles of the late 1970s to late 1980s, the late 1990s to mid-2000s, and elements of Modern Medieval fashion, boho-chic, Indie sleaze and mid-century fashions from the 1940s, 1950s and 1960s. The early and mid 2020s were driven by microtrends, social media influencers, and niche online communities that transformed internet aesthetics into the dominant tastemakers for fashion. Early in the decade, several publications noted the shortening trend cycles, niche revivals, and nostalgia cycles in 2020s fashion. The COVID-19 pandemic also had a major impact on the fashion industry and led to shifting retail and consumer trends.

In the 2020s, many companies, including fast fashion giants such as Shein and Temu, began using social media platforms such as TikTok and Instagram as a marketing tool. Marketing strategies involving third parties, particularly influencers and celebrities, have become prominent tactics. E-commerce platforms that promote small businesses, such as Depop and Etsy, grew by offering vintage, homemade, or resold clothing from individual sellers. Thrifting also exploded in popularity because of the potential to find valuable pieces of clothing at cheaper prices.

== General trends ==
=== Trends influenced by the COVID-19 pandemic ===
At the start of the COVID-19 pandemic, wearing a face mask was common and often mandatory. The mask shortage, the desire for self-expression, and the ability to quickly make masks without fancy technology soon led to many mask designs. People began wearing masks in different fabrics, colors, and patterns to match their clothing. This allowed them to follow health recommendations and regulations while expressing also their style.

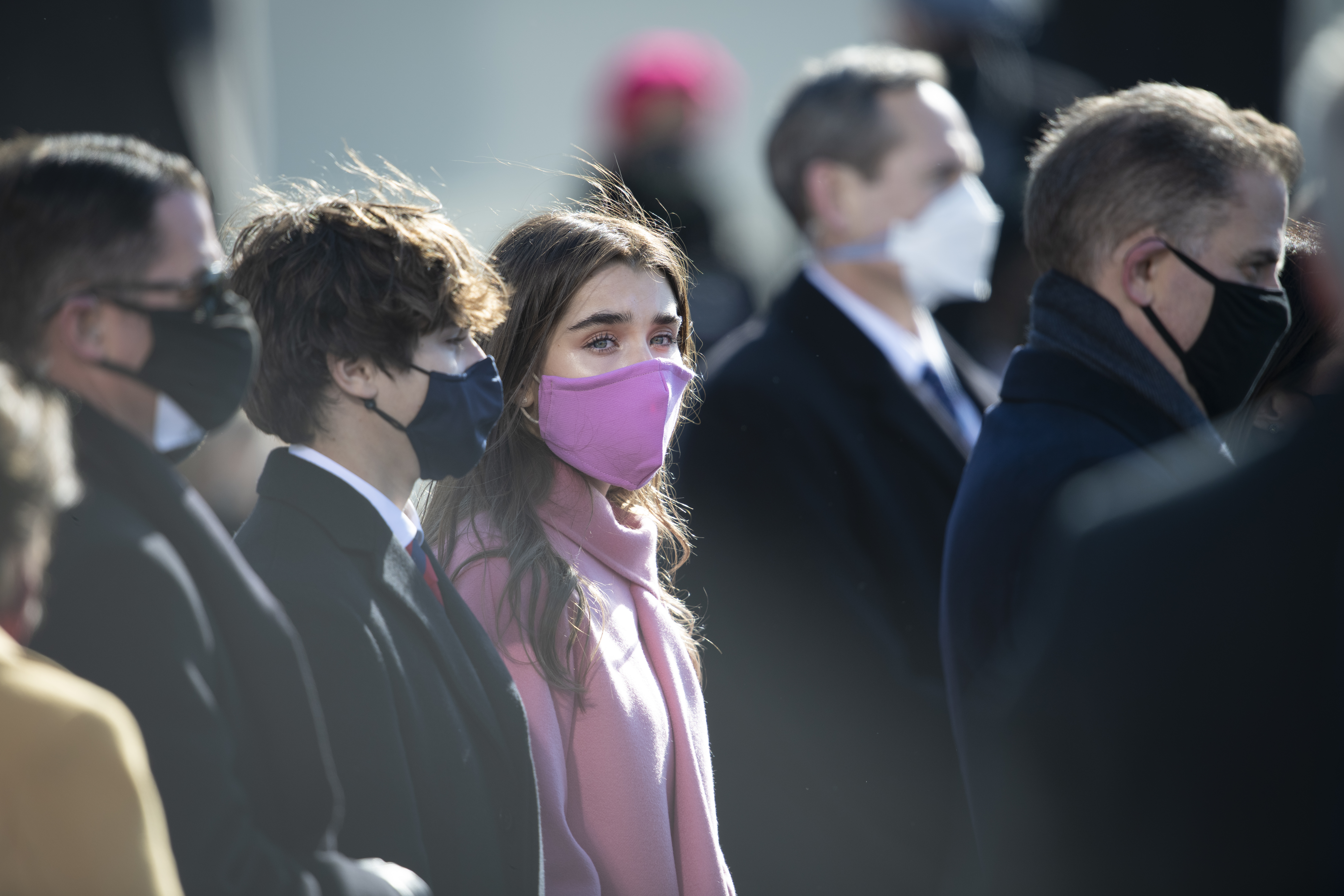
2021: Natalie Biden wearing a matching cloth COVID-19 mask at the inauguration of Joe Biden, her grandfather

After the COVID-19 pandemic began, fashion trends shifted significantly, with a resurgence of 1980s-inspired styles such as scrunchies and modern 80s hairstyles. On social media platforms such as TikTok, nostalgia for the 1980s also grew through the popularity of VHS (Video Home System)-style edits and filters designed to imitate the look of analog video recordings. Another shift in fashion trends was the notable move towards comfort. This change was especially noticeable in American public schools and universities, where students embraced more relaxed and casual clothing. As remote learning became normalized, students in both K-12 schools and higher education increasingly favored comfortable clothing like pajamas, crew socks and athleisure wear, reflecting a broader cultural shift toward prioritizing comfort, functionality, and ease over formality. After the return to physical classrooms, many students continued to embrace comfortable clothing, including pajama-style pants and loungewear.

Despite the return to maximalism in certain fashion circles, the vast majority of people continued to choose comfortable clothing, reflecting the growing emphasis on casual and relaxed styles, prioritizing functionality and comfort.

=== Over-consumption and fast fashion ===
The growth of social media in the 2010s, especially Instagram and TikTok, made it easier to discover and share styles, leading to the rise of microtrends. Microtrends often lasted only a few weeks or months and contradicted each other, making it seem like many styles were trending all at once. Clothing brands and manufacturers kept up with these microtrends, fueling the fast fashion industry, characterized by clothes made quickly and sold cheaply to drive overconsumption.

The quick production and constant demand for new styles have raised environmental concerns. Many environmental advocates claim that the fast fashion industry causes excessive waste and pollution, contributing to global environmental crises. According to UN News, "The fashion industry is one of the world's most polluting sectors, responsible for up to eight per cent of global greenhouse gas emissions."

Social media played a major role in the decline of a "mono-fashion culture," in which one dominant style defined an entire era. This sparked the rise of the "anti-fashion" trend, which was a response to how the internet turned microtrends into mainstream subcultures and niche aesthetics. The anti-fashion movement pushed back against following fleeting trends, instead rejecting traditional fashion rules and celebrating individuality.

=== Athleisure and activewear ===
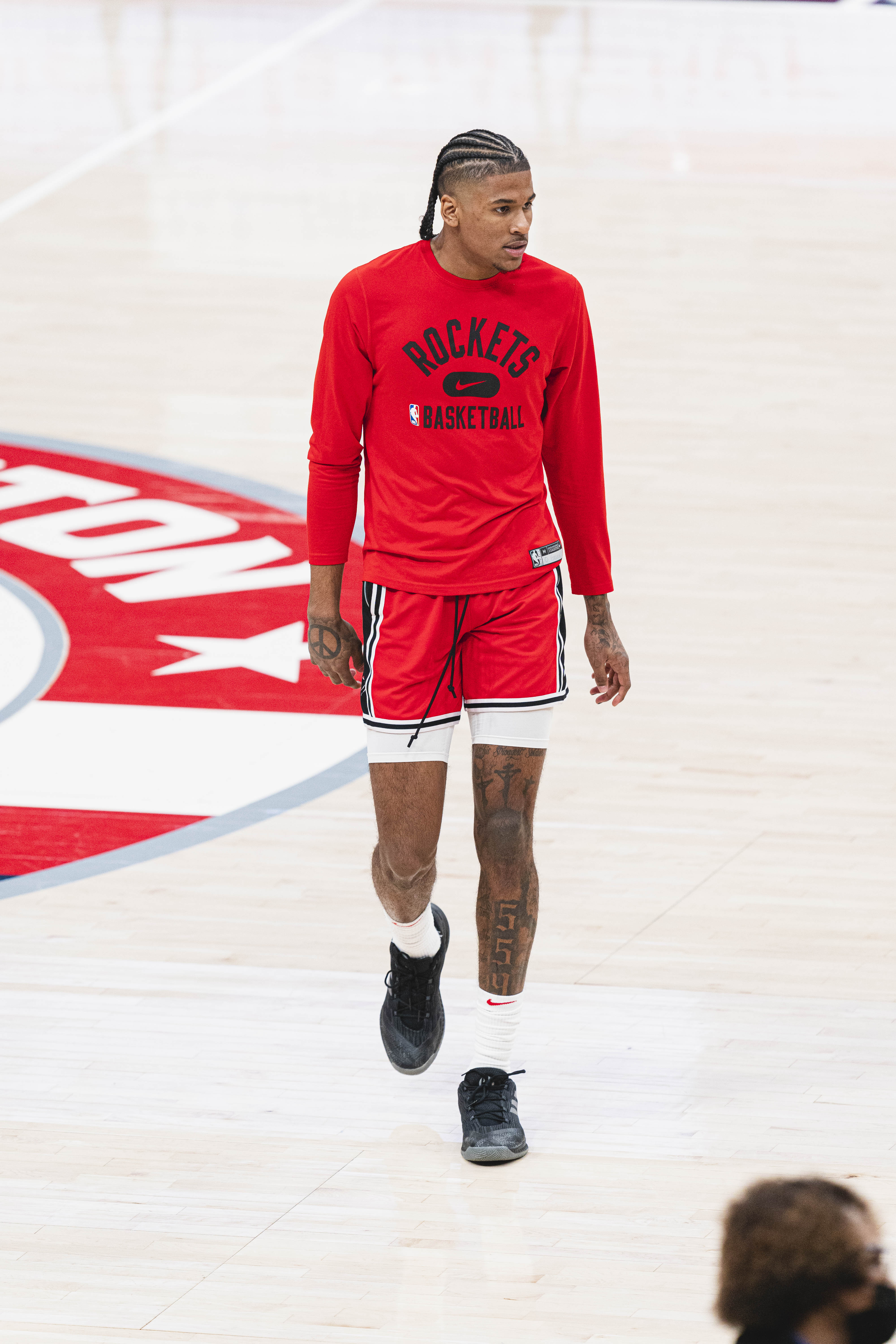
NBA player Jalen Green wearing 5-inch inseams, crew socks, and visible boxer briefs—a common early 2020s style choice.

The 2020s saw the continued demand for athleisure, as athletic clothing remained a fashionable choice for everyday wear. Athletic wear such as sweat-suits, and sneakers remained staples in millennial, Gen Z, and Gen Alpha wardrobes. Yoga Pants and sports bras remained popular in athleisure wardrobes for women, while men commonly wore 5-inch inseam athletic shorts and hoodies for comfort and mainstream style.

Athleisure could be considered the decade-defining style due to its cross-generational appeal and everyday function. While some point to the COVID-19 pandemic as a catalyst for the rise of casual clothing, market research suggests that athleisure never truly went out of style. In fact, athleisure has gained popularity over the years because it transitions seamlessly from the gym to everyday activities. This trend is further reinforced by the growing focus on health and wellness, as people seek clothing that keeps them active and comfortable all day. Gen Z professionals are increasingly adopting activewear as appropriate workplace attire, allowing companies to support their employees' fashion choices.

=== Maximalist fashion ===
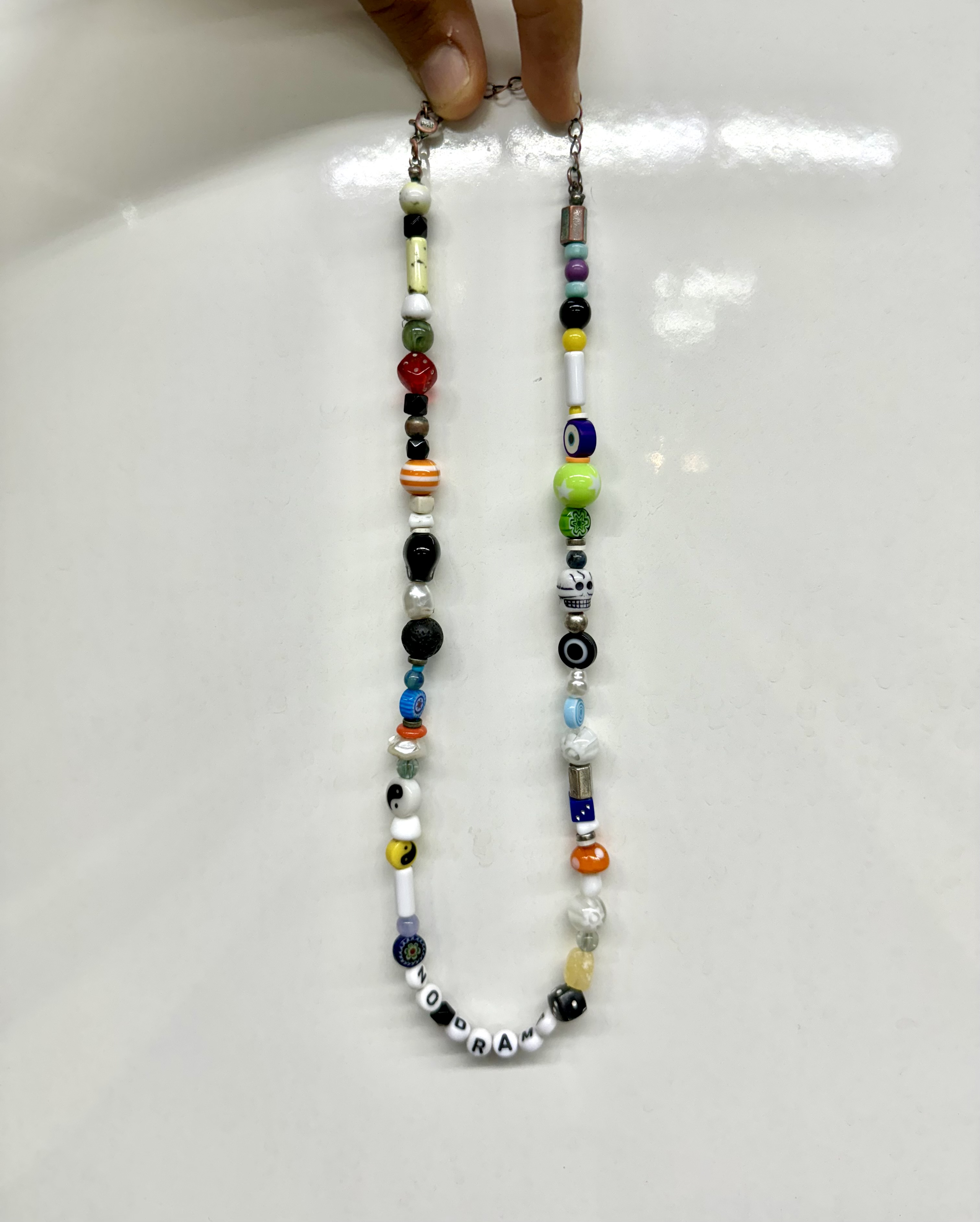
Maximalist necklace, unknown designer, produced by Pull&Bear, c.2023

As the decade began, maximalist fashion resurfaced on the runway to express individuality and break away from the previous decades minimalist style. After spending time indoors during the pandemic, many fashion designers gravitated towards bold, colorful, and creative styles. Although maximalism gained popularity in high fashion and online communities, streetwear maintained the go-to choice for much of the wider public, especially for those who favor comfort and simplicity.

=== Backlash to 2010s trends and fashion ===
From 2020-2023 there was a widespread rejection of the form-fitting 2010s fashion in the UK, Europe and America. Due to the Covid lockdowns, the slim-fitting business suits of the previous decade went out of style in favor of comfy, loose-fitting athleisure clothing as more people were able to work from home. When men returned to the office in 2021, the tight suits of the 2010s had been replaced by less restrictive styles. Although they were a fashion must-have in the 2010s, skinny jeans faced brief backlash at the start of the decade. Many Gen Z TikTok influencers claimed skinny jeans no longer symbolized youth culture, sparking controversy among many fashion bloggers and millennial women. Gen Z influencers also deemed side parts out of style, along with no-show socks, as Gen Z opted for crew socks. The term cheugy describes "tacky millennial fashion." The early 2020s trend cycle seemed to contradict itself, with microtrends like the Y2K revival and early 2010s nostalgia emerging alongside the millennial backlash.

=== Quiet luxury ===
From 2022 to 2025, clothing with bold logos began to lose popularity as fashion trends shifted toward simpler, more minimalist styles. This began a shift away from the flashy, logo-centered designs that dominated the late 2010s. Many consumers began preferring the materiality of the clothing, including fabric texture, color, and shape, rather than brand names.

During this shift, the desire to understand quiet luxury and “timeless” designs grew. This trend was also connected to the rise of the “old-money” aesthetic, which was inspired by extravagant European houses and the preference for luxury over displays of wealth or brand association. The transition toward quiet luxury was also influenced by the fashion choices of wealthy celebrities and public figures, who often wore minimalist but high-style attire. Many shoppers, aiming to imitate these celebrities, adopted similar styles in an attempt to mirror the sophisticated, understated look associated with the elite. The influence of these celebrities helped popularize the idea that wealth and status could be expressed through subtle, tasteful fashion choices rather than overt displays of brand names.

== Women's clothing ==
=== Early 2020s (2020–2023) ===
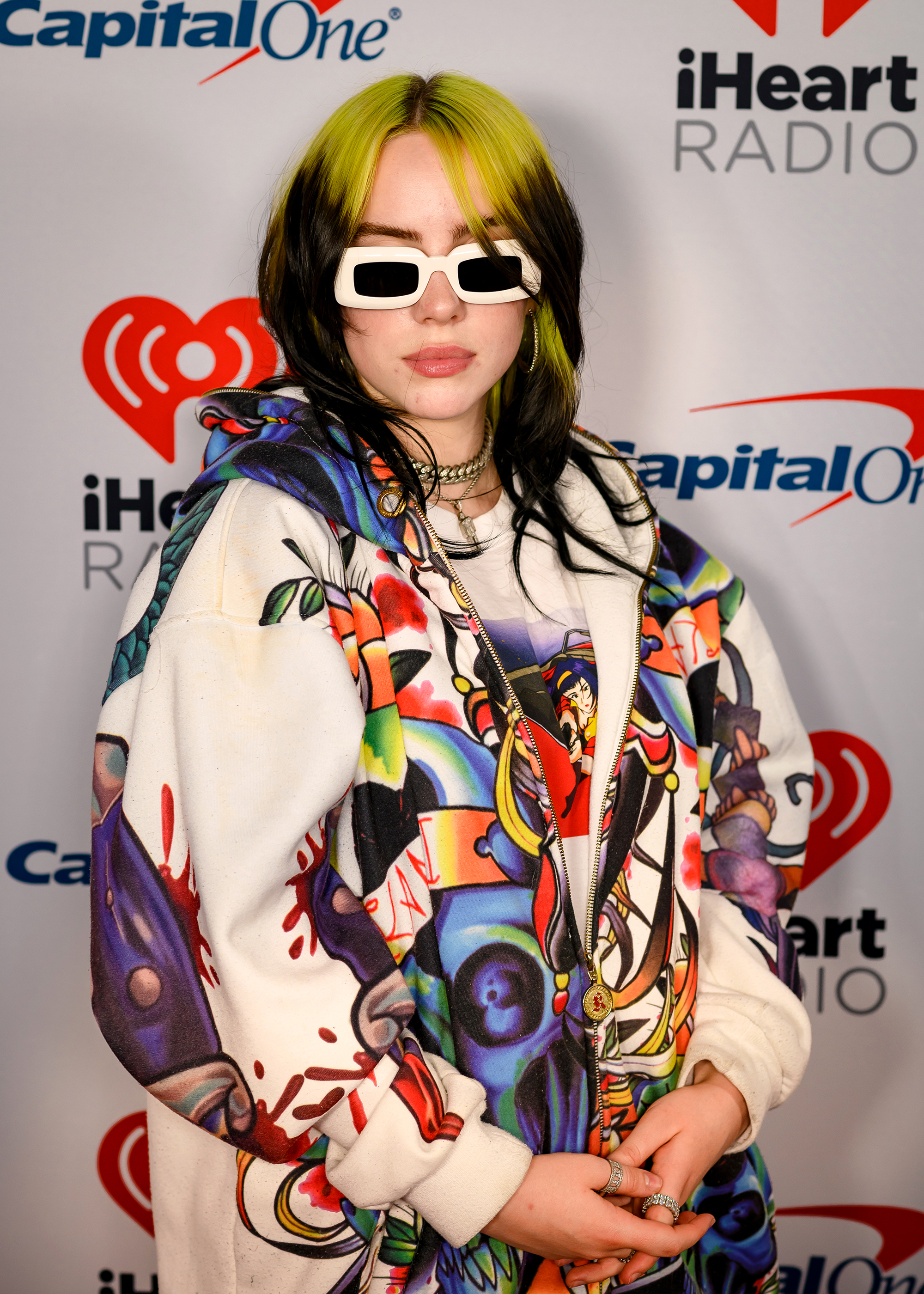
American singer Billie Eilish is among the notable examples of Y2K fashion revival.

==== Late 1990s–2000s revival ====
Y2K women's fashion from the late 1990s and 2000s became a major influence, especially among social media users. This marked a distinct difference from the fashion of the previous decade, which pulled inspiration from early to mid-'90s styles. The COVID crisis had an impact on fashion continuity, which Vogue described as a "chaotic, creative mix of idiosyncratic takes on what the post-pandemic world wants right now."

Popular shirts, coats, and dresses from this time included puffer jackets made from up-cycled deadstock fabric, sweatshirts, high waisted pants, tucked-in sweaters, camisoles and crop tops, low-rise miniskirts, brocade topcoats, midriff-baring tops, ribbed turtlenecks, garish Ed Hardy style T-shirts with rhinestones, off-the-shoulder knitted tops, science fiction-inspired metallic jackets, loose-fitting shift dresses or blouses, pantywaist tops sometimes with cap sleeves, cashmere cardigans, and oversized 1980s-inspired dog's tooth check jackets popularized by Kaia Gerber and Miley Cyrus.

Popular shoes and accessories included Crocs, platform sandals, knee-high boots, ballet flats, white sneakers (such as Vans, Keds, Nike Air Force 1s, Nike Low Court Vision, or Converse), fringed handbags, multicolored 1980s-inspired earrings made from recycled ocean plastic, white bralettes, chunky cable knit scarves, Chelsea boots, and Doc Martens.

Some women also shifted to vintage and cruelty-free clothing. In the UK, a number of women rejected nylon, acrylic, rayon, new cotton, and polyester fabrics in favor of tencel, linen, organic cotton, and recycled polyester.

Generation Z girls in India, Pakistan and Sri Lanka repurposed the sari worn by their mothers, pairing it with sneakers, casual knitwear, crop tops, T-shirts, black Oxford shoes, Y2K-inspired platform sandals, and sportswear. The dresses were often made in contrasting shades of grey, black, and blush pink, often being seen as a modern and corporate look.

==== 1960s influences ====
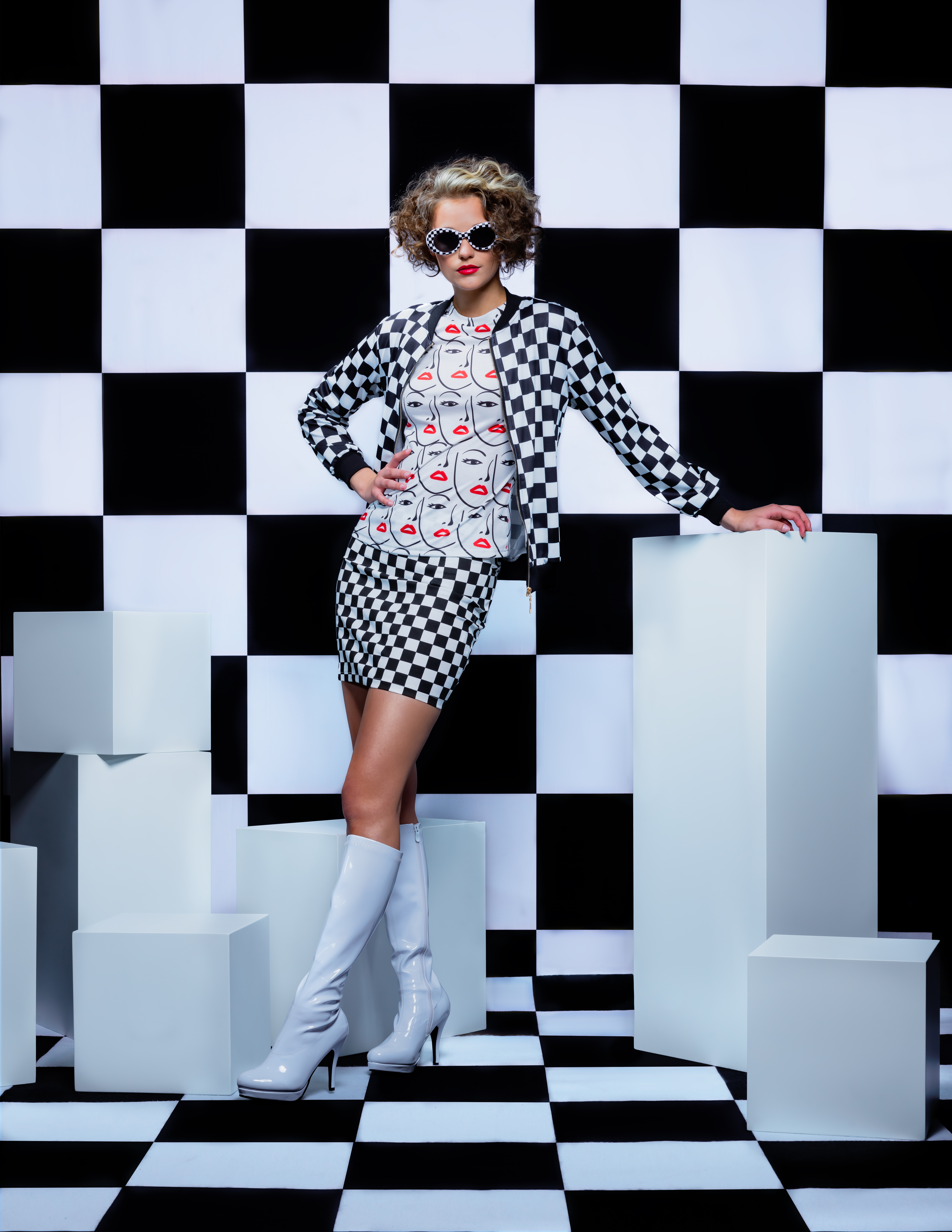
1960s-inspired outfit from 2021 featuring knee high boots, pop-art-inspired top, miniskirt, and cardigan with checkerboard motif.

The spring of 2021 saw a revival of psychedelic mid-to-late 1960s fashion worldwide. Clothing such as miniskirts, slim-fit capri pants, flared trousers, patched jeans, gingham shorts, and cropped slim jeans were some of the popular bottom choices for younger women from 2021 to 2024. Bridgerton inspired and popularized empire-line, linen milkmaid dresses, as well as maxi dresses. Shoes included ballet flats or hippie-styled sandals to match with the boho skirts. Gingham vests and thigh skimming jackets were popular outerwear. Copenhagen laced blouses with a Danish influence were common as well.

==== Comfortcore, cottagecore and coastal grandmother ====
The lockdowns caused by the COVID-19 pandemic led many women to prefer wearing more comfortable clothes. From 2020 to 2022, many subtrends emerged from this so-called comfortcore movement.

Cardigan and flannel coats worn by Taylor Swift, representative of the cottagecore subtrend.

A nostalgia-driven sub-trend was cottagecore (with subtrends being grandmacore, fairycore, farmcore, and goblincore).The cottagecore style is defined by pastel colors and palettes that evokes a romantic, idealized country aesthetic. Typical clothing includes prairie dresses, blue gingham mini-dresses, white gypsy tops with multicolored Mexican-inspired floral embroidery, and hippie-style maxi dresses inspired by those worn during the late 1960s. The cottagecore subtrend was reinforced by Taylor Swift's 2020 albums Folklore and Evermore.

An urban cottagecore trend known as "allotment chic" became popular in the UK in the early to mid 2020s, definded by garden workwear. Key garments included oversized linen gilets, cotton twill maxi skirts, pinafore dresses, cropped dungaree pants with multiple pockets, chunky knitted cardigan sweaters, and earth tones such as olive green, brown, sage green, marigold yellow, tangerine orange, and ecru.

"Retirement-wear" was a subtrend where young Gen Z and millennial women in the US adopted the comfy-looking style of their elders and borrowed styles from nostalgia-filled figures such as Diane Keaton. The 2022 trend "coastal grandmother" brought a "beachy, romantic aesthetic" associated with the rural American East Coast. It combined elements of cottagecore with spring and fall beachwear, especially white jeans, cashmere turtleneck sweaters, pastel pink flip-flops, woven tote bags made from recycled fabric, and straw beekeeper style sun hats.

=== Mid 2020s (2024–2026) ===
==== Dopamine dressing and oversized garments ====
Inspired by the maximalist and 1980s trends of the early 2020s, vibrant clothing made a striking comeback for women in the US, France, China, South Korea, and Ukraine by spring 2023. This "dopamine dressing" movement featured long skirts, belted maxi dresses with thigh splits, and plenty of gold and pearl jewelry, along with neon blue tights.

Oversized striped cardigans, multicolored silk skirts with seashell or floral prints, and strappy sandals were also in vogue. The style included contrasting stripe pants, Ugg boots, floral maxi skirts, Y2K-inspired platform shoes, and chunky red rain boots. Shimmery jumpsuits, knitted dresses, and leather pilot jackets with faux fur collars added flair, while bold vertical-striped skirts, bootcut trouser suits, and jeans with glittery accents completed the look.

A dressier, more summery variant of dopamine dressing, known as "Italian garden party core", incorporated Mediterranean-inspired elements of cottagecore, such as pink Mary Janes, white, green, baby blue or pink shirt dresses with fruit, leaf and floral patterns, straw hats, peach colored off the shoulder peplum dresses, and gladiator sandals.

Big, oversized garments were often made from translucent materials and featured cutouts intended to expose the wearer's bare shoulder, thigh, or midriff, such as low-cut waists on the pants or tops with strappy necklines intended to be worn braless.

==== Glamour wear ====
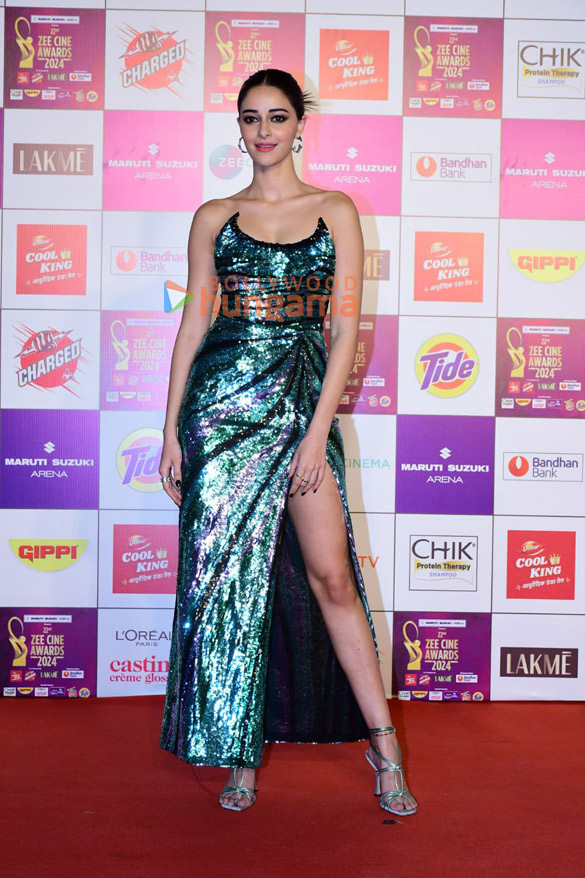
Indian actress Ananya Panday wearing long green sequin dress, 2024

In the UK and the US, luxury fashions often with shiny or metallic detailing became popular evening wear and clubwear from the winter of 2023 to the spring of 2025. An extension of dopamine dressing, these glitzy trends were a direct reaction to the super casual trends during the COVID-19 pandemic, intending to showcase a renewed appreciation for going out.

Dresses were usually either short or asymmetrical and often in metallic colors, or covered in sequins to achieve a similar effect. Sometimes dresses would be decorated with ribbons, feathers, or polka dots. Other popular options included knitted dresses featuring Nordic patterns and gothic-inspired midi dresses. Popular tops were satin blouses, pantywaist tops, or full black tuxedo styled suits. Trousers were often flared or silver. Outerwear (such as sweaters, overcoats, sport coats, and jackets) was inspired by old money or quiet luxury fashions. Alternatively, some went for an opposite feel with sequined tuxedo jackets or a more "western" look with western shirts or fringe jackets. Footwear would often include rhinestone cowboy boots, Mary Janes, ballet flats, pointy court shoes, and block heel knee-high boots. Popular accessories included silver or enamel jewelry (often inspired by Scandinavian fashion), small leather handbags, and baguette bags.

Many younger women hire going-out outfits from websites like Net-a-Porter rather than buying fast fashion dresses and only wearing them once on a night out.

==== Balletcore fashion and boho-chic fashion ====
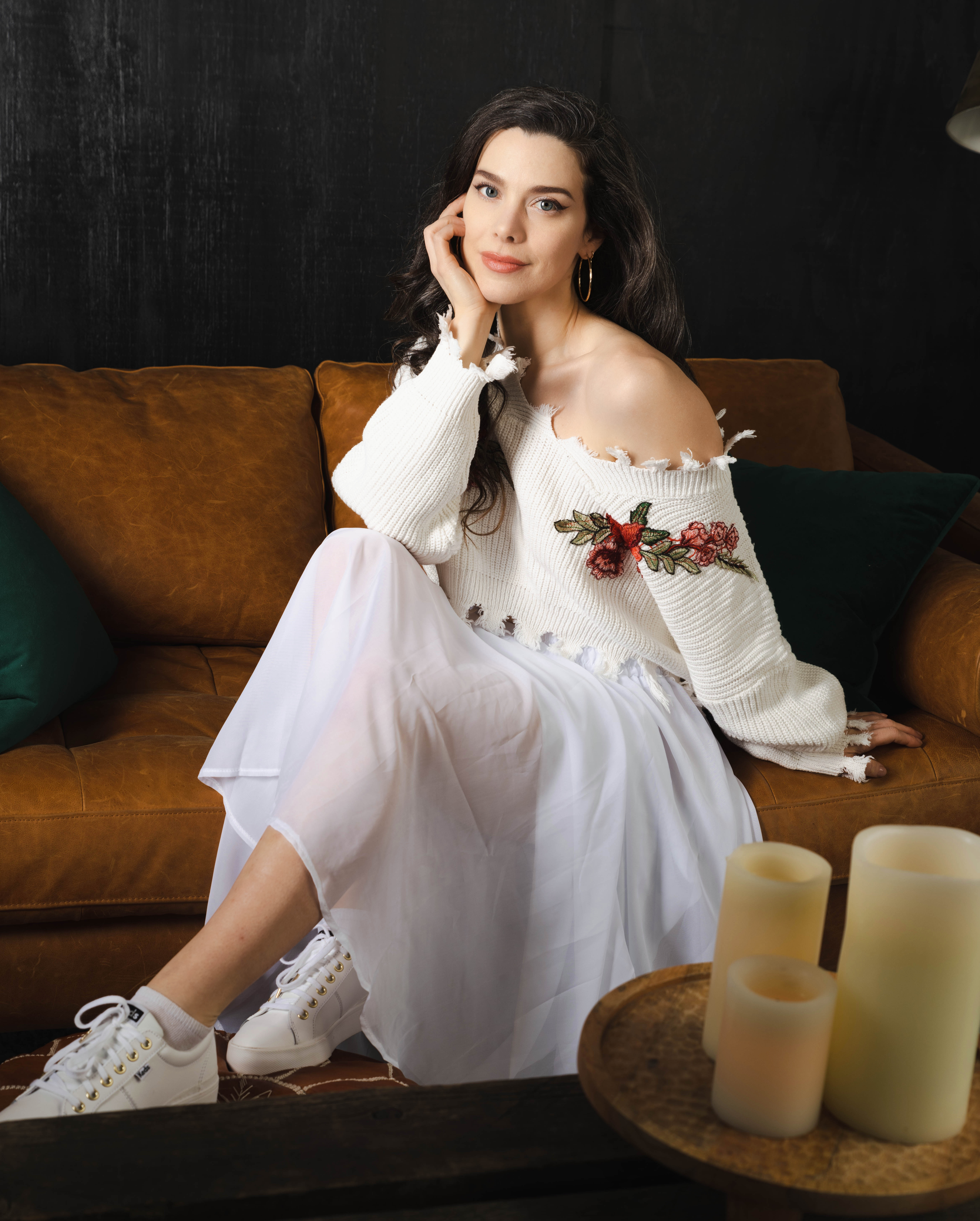
Balletcore inspired skirt worn with boho-chic sweater and retro sneakers, 2023

Ballerina-inspired fashion in the mid-2020s changed both high fashion and street style. This trend featured soft tulle, delicate lace, wraparound shapes, ballerina skirts, and ballet flats, especially shoes with bows and ankle straps. It highlighted a feminine and romantic look with pastel colors and high-waisted, flowy skirts, often worn with bike shorts or leggings. Capped-sleeve bodysuits and off-the-shoulder tops became popular in Singapore, the UK, and the US.

The trend also influenced hairstyles like soft buns and loose waves, along with accessories such as ribbon chokers and ballet-inspired shoes. Ballerina fashion brought a whimsical and ethereal beauty to the industry and increased the popularity of ballet-style workout clothes that combined style with function.

==== African fashion ====
By 2025, Nigerian, Ghanaian, and South African haute couture brands like Maxhosa had gained a following on global catwalks including London, Paris, Milan, and New York. Modern African clothing featured prominent stripes and diamond motifs and was often made in bright colors like cyan, yellow, purple, red, orange, and pink with black or white contrasts. Satin blouses, kaftans repurposed as dresses, miniskirts made from repurposed shopping bags, maxi dresses, sandals with decorative beadwork, fish leather handbags, rain boots, and brown or red leather jackets were popular. Many Black American and Afro-Caribbean women and girls were eager to rediscover their African heritage and imported traditional clothing from Africa, including authentic Nigerian prom dresses.

==== Neo-Medieval fashion ====
In the winter of 2025, neo-medieval, gothic and folk costume inspired outfits emerged in the US and parts of central Europe as part of a backlash against the increasingly techno-feudal direction taken by modern society. Sometimes known as bardcore or castle-core, this trend combined feminism with hedonistic luxury fabrics like velvet, lace, jacquard, silk, leather, fur, and brocade. Popular items included ankle-length skirts, long shift dresses, corsets, fur lined cloaks, studded leather jackets, tattoos inspired by illuminated manuscripts, decorative wooden and glass beads, heraldry motifs, belts with oversized buckles, pointed boots sometimes decorated with metal toe and heel plates resembling a knight's sabatons, and chain mail jewelry.

== Men's clothing ==
=== Early 2020s (2020–2023) ===
==== Late 1990s–2000s influences ====
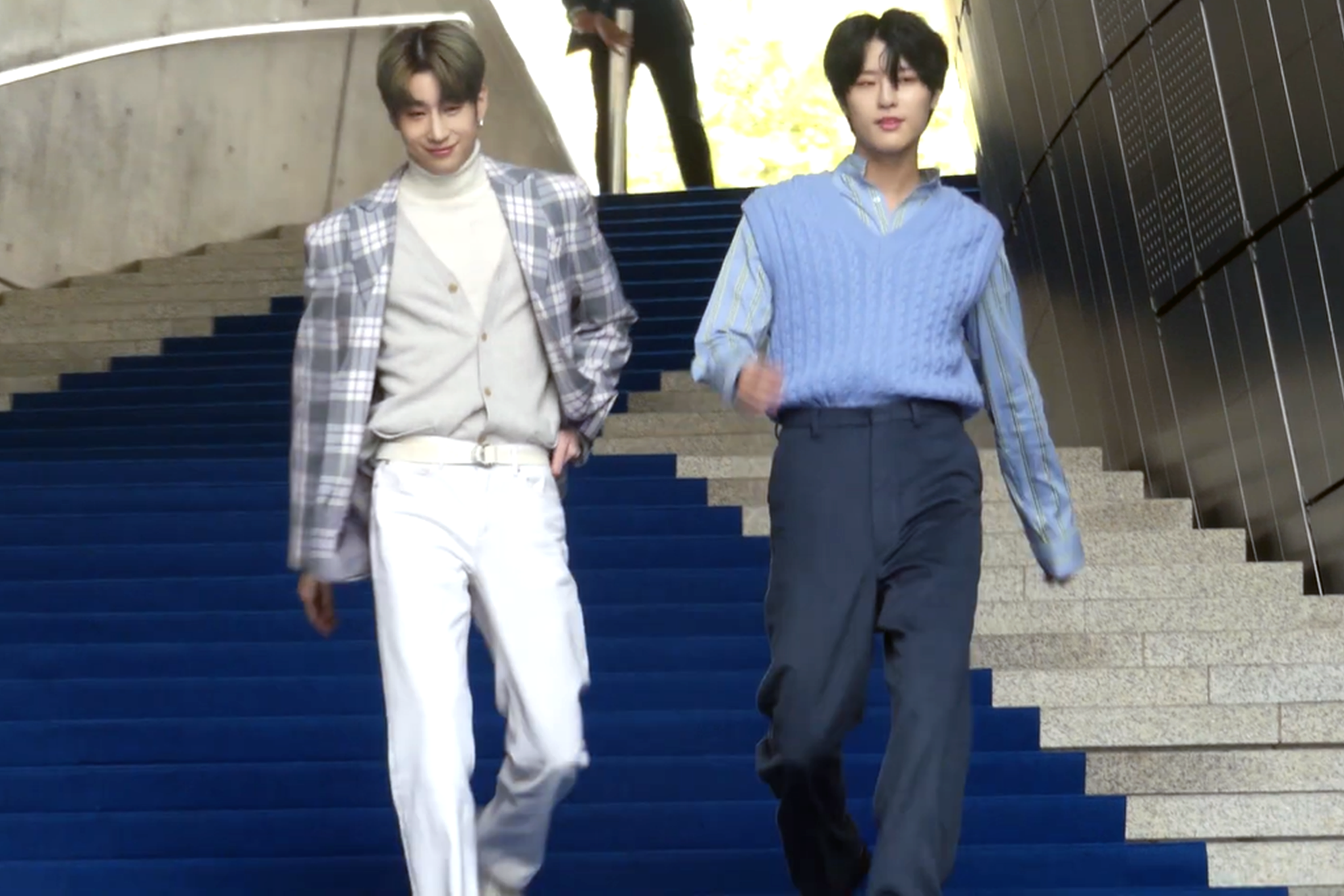
2020–21: Korean men in the 1980s- and 2000s-inspired outfits fashionable in the early 2020s.

The 20-year trend cycle was important as the decade started, bringing back Y2K men's fashion from the late 1990s and 2000s, especially among social media users.This was a big change from the fashion of the previous decade, which was inspired by early to mid-'90s styles. This included mixing selected contemporary fashion brands with original vintage clothing and recent thrift shop finds.

Popular trends across the world included crew neck shirts, U.S. Woodland camouflage baseball caps, straight leg jeans instead of the skinny jeans, bold multicolor motif shirts tracksuits, jogger pants, trench coats, leather reefer jackets, imitation leather messenger bags,s and club wear.

During the 2022 FIFA World Cup, Welsh fans brought back various 2000s fashion trends. These included hip-hop-inspired track jackets, athletic tank tops, wide-leg jeans, turtleneck sweaters, Burberry motifs, neon socks, cargo pants, and bomber jackets, among others. The fans embraced a mix of retro styles, showcasing a blend of comfortable and bold fashion choices reminiscent of that era.

Common footwear included classic Air Jordan sneakers, loafers with chunky brothel creeper soles, suede desert boots, Vans sneakers, imitation leather Adidas trainers, suede Timberland boots, Gucci loafers, duck boots, suede Beatle boots, chunky hiking sandals, high top Converse All-Stars, Nike Air Max sneakers, worker boots, and combat boots bought as army surplus.

Because of the increase in remote work, workplace dress codes became more casual in the UK and US. Employees returning to the office frequently combined 1990s fashion–inspired business casual attire with elements of loungewear and athleisure such as monotone sneakers, hoodies, shorts, and dark grey sweatpants.

Due to gym closures during lockdown, digital smart watches with timers replaced analog wristwatches as many young men in Europe and the US subscribed to online apps for tracking and planning their exercise routines at home. In the UK, Middle East, and some parts of Africa, keffiyehs were used in an attempt to block viruses and to show support for Palestinian nationalism.

==== 1980s revival ====
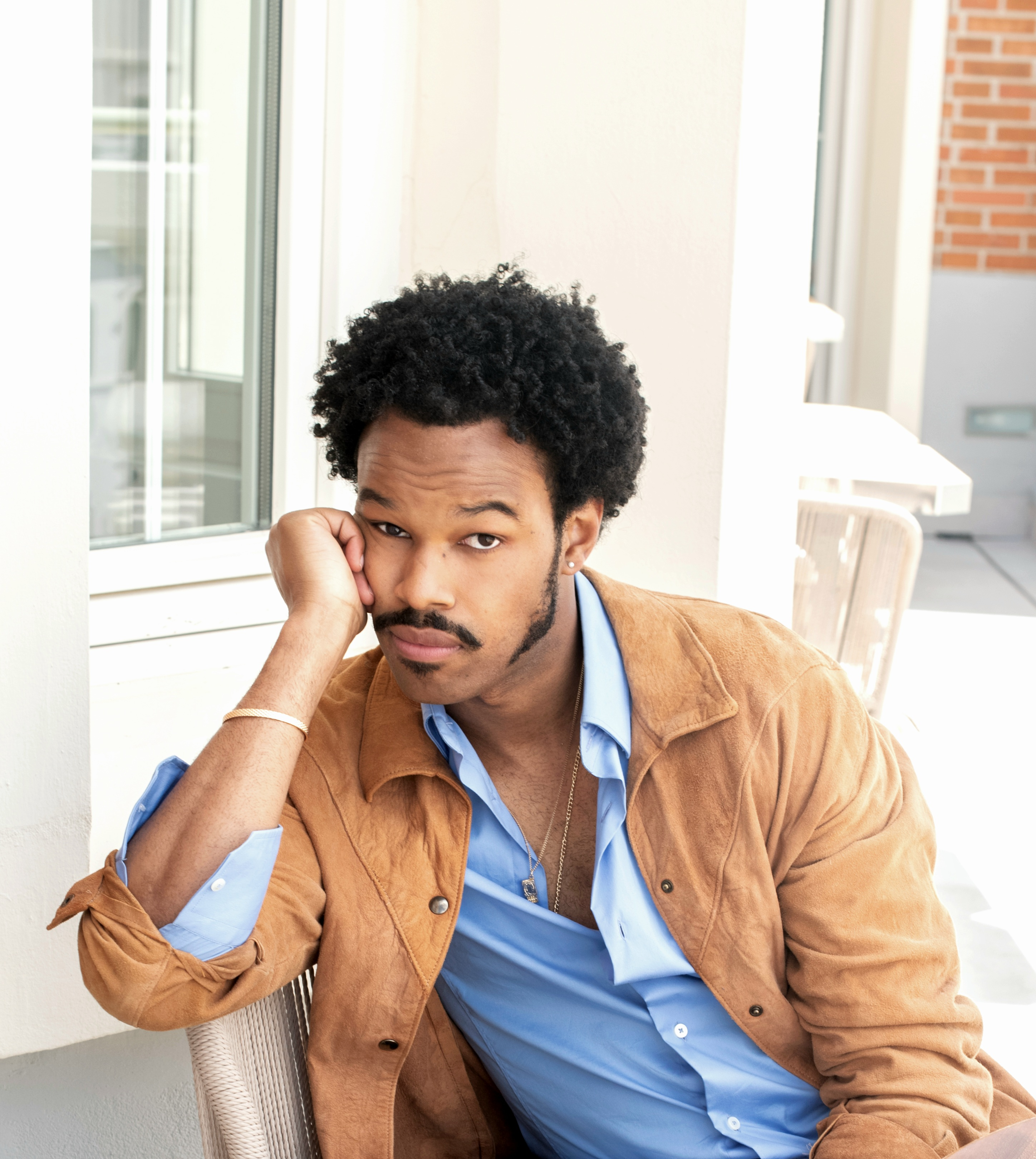
Dominican Republican–Spanish actor Jean Cruz wearing an early 1980s-inspired outfit in 2021

Due to the continued influence of vintage fashion and retro-inspired pop culture, 1970s and 1980s styles maintained a steady presence in the fashion industry throughout the 2020s. Clothing such as pinstripes, textured knits with vertical stripes, leather waistcoats, corduroy clothing, 5-inch inseam shorts, power suits with shoulder pads, pleated trousers, and Chelsea boots regained popularity. Shirts with large and pointed collars became trendy again. The increased formality for men returning to the office was, in part, a reaction to the ubiquitous casual wear associated with working from home during the COVID-19 lockdowns of 2020–21.

From 2020 to 2024, popular clothing styles in the UK and the US included sports-logo and color-block clothing, Harrington jackets,and brothel creepers. Miami Vice-inspired suits were also trendy.

Other favored items were baseball jackets, stonewashed denim jackets, and plaid trucker-style jackets with sheepskin lining. Aviator sunglasses, brown shearling flight jackets, and plaid suits became popular, along with striped cardigan sweaters and classic sneakers like white Converse All-Stars.

Tan gabardine trench coats, preppy Aran and Fair Isle cardigans, and safari suits were in demand for business casual wear. Double-breasted blazers inspired by 1940s styles returned as power suits in the 1980s.

Camp collar shirts with bold prints, corduroy sports coats, wool scarves, tricolor socks, Vans shoes, and vintage graphic t-shirts also gained popularity.

Other desired articles of clothing included stylized representations of palm trees or cassette players, and 1980s movie posters such as Star Wars or the Ghostbusters logo due to the unexpected popularity of the 2021 film.

==== The resurgence of short shorts for men ====
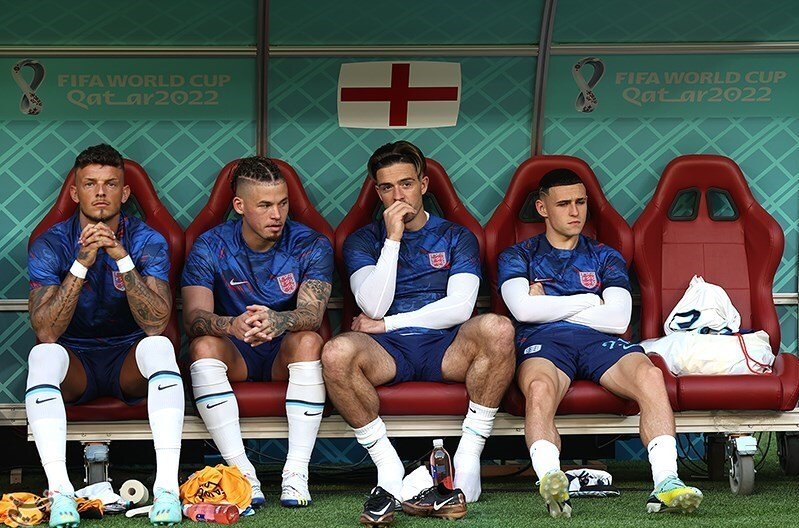
Jack Grealish wearing 5-inch inseams with crew socks during the 2022 FIFA World Cup.

5-inch inseam shorts became popular in the U.S. during the early 2020s, following their success in Europe. NBA players and celebrities helped make these shorts a must-have for many American men, especially those in Gen Z and Gen Alpha, driven by changing pop culture and the rise of athleisure.

Celebrities like Pedro Pascal, Paul Mescal, and Donald Glover wore these shorts in public, drawing positive attention on social media. Brands like Gymshark and Nike created tailored athletic shorts suitable for workouts and casual wear.

Constructed from materials like linen, cotton, and polyester, these shorts earned nicknames like “hoochie daddy shorts.” They became a popular fashion choice and part of the evolving trends in men's clothing, coexisting with longer, 2000s-inspired shorts.

==== Workwear and street fashion ====
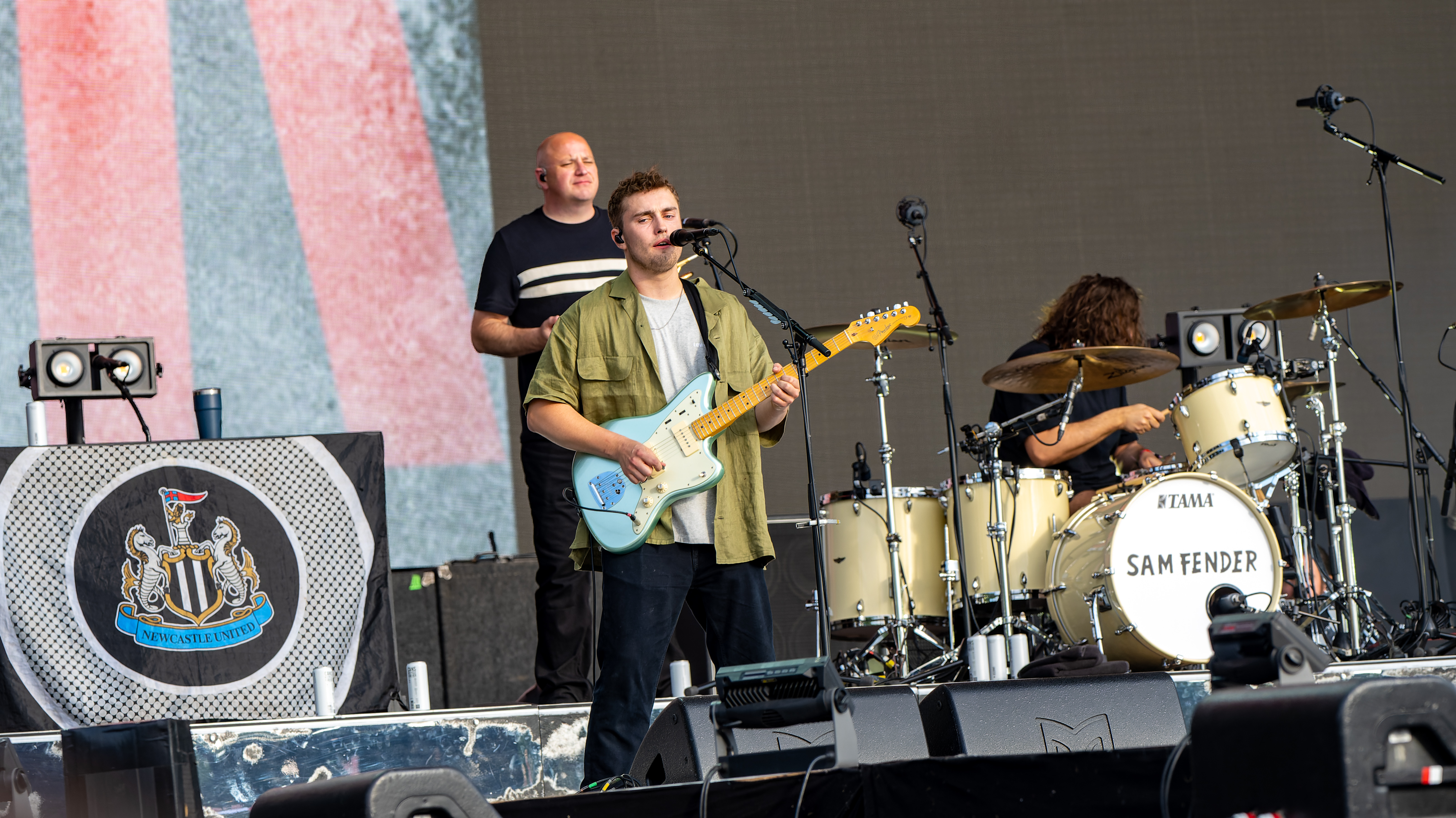
Oversized workwear-inspired outfit worn by indie rocker Sam Fender in 2021.

Workwear has evolved from being popular among blue-collar Americans to a trendy staple for urban Gen Z men in the 2020s. Brands like Dickies, Carhartt, and Bass Pro Shop, once tied to labor-intensive jobs, gained traction in the fashion world, especially within LGBTQ+ spaces.Independent menswear stores like American Classics and Oi Polloi introduced these items, which include work boots, crewneck shirts, and overalls, to streetwear enthusiasts.This led to their availability in department stores and being adopted by fast-fashion brands, merging Southern Americana and country music influences with hip-hop and skate culture to create a distinct masculine aesthetic.

==== Gender neutral clothing ====
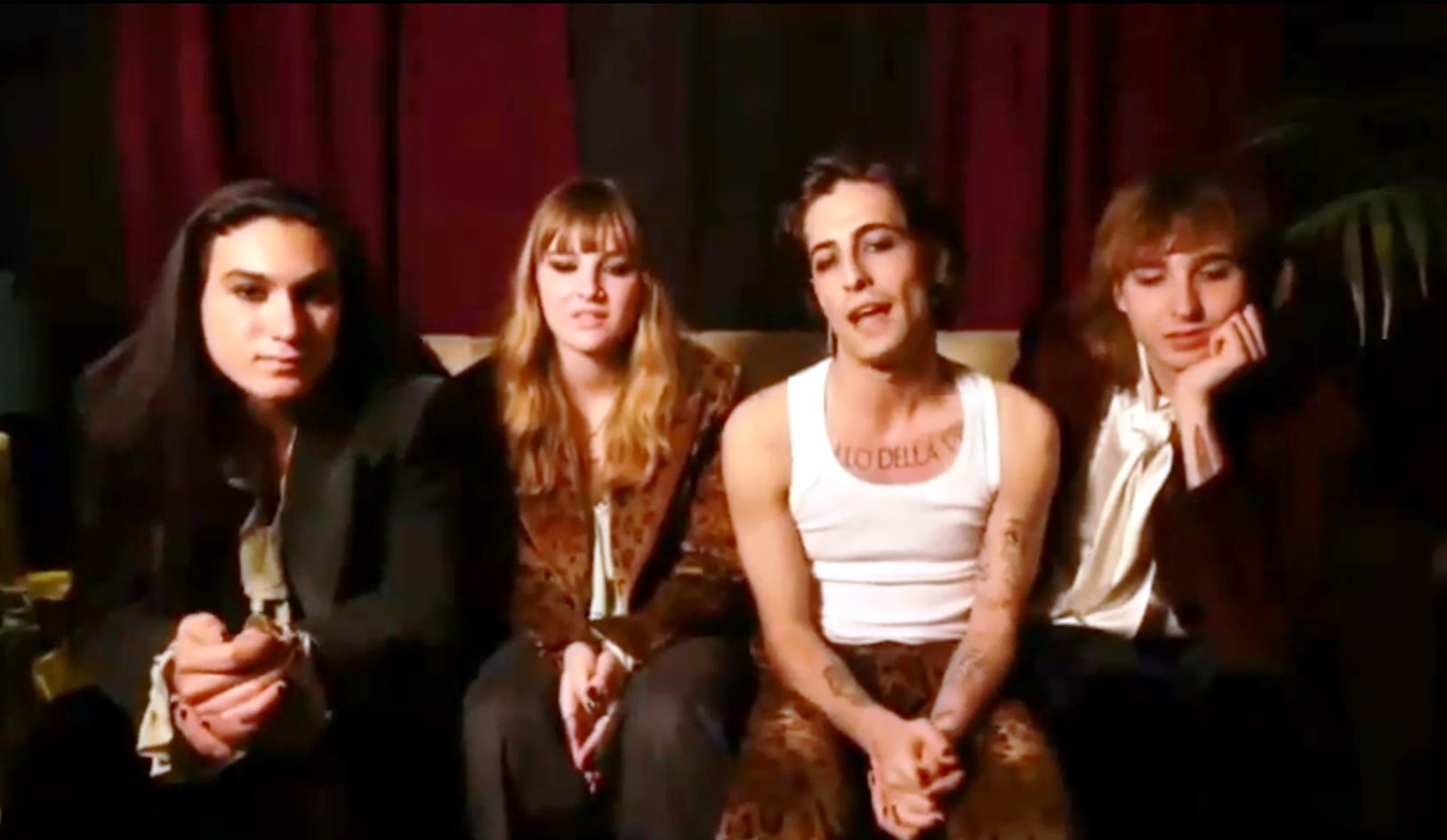
2021: Italian band Måneskin in androgynous outfits.

Genderless fashion has gained popularity on the red carpet, online, and in LGBTQ+ spaces, serving as a form of self-expression that challenges traditional norms. Despite this, gendered clothing remains the standard in much of the US and Europe. Originating as a niche trend in Japan, genderless styles became mainstream in the US, South Korea, and the UK by 2021, with androgynous looks reshaping male beauty standards. Influences include 1980s fashion, anime, and K-pop boy bands, featuring elements like dyed hair, makeup, short shorts, knee socks, and bright colors.

Men on the red carpet are wearing more accessories, like feather boas and pearl jewelry.They are also choosing popular clothing items such as kimono-style shirts, frilly lace blouses, and tunics. Footwear includes boots with stacked Cuban heels, crop tops, furry ugg boots, and kilts. Some are seen in mint green safari jackets with Nudie Cohn-inspired embroidery, shiny jackets with shoulder pads and puffy sleeves, and flared trousers. Additionally, transparent shirts and shawl lapel sports coats, sometimes decorated with sequins or rhinestones, are common. Oversized silk shirts are fashionable, along with suits in bold colors like gold lamé, shiny green sequins, or fuchsia.

The leading trendsetters in androgynous fashion during this time included Harry Styles, Italian shock rock group Maneskin, actor Timothée Chalamet, Bad Bunny, Lil Nas X, Billy Porter, Brad Pitt, Paul Mescal, African entrepreneur Ezra Olubi, and Jimin. Due to the influence of artists like Ru Paul, Jodie Harsh and gay singer Sam Smith, drag queen-inspired outfits went mainstream. Influential designers included Harris Reed, JW Anderson, and Bode.

=== Mid 2020s (2024–2026) ===
==== Vintage Americana and patriotic motifs ====
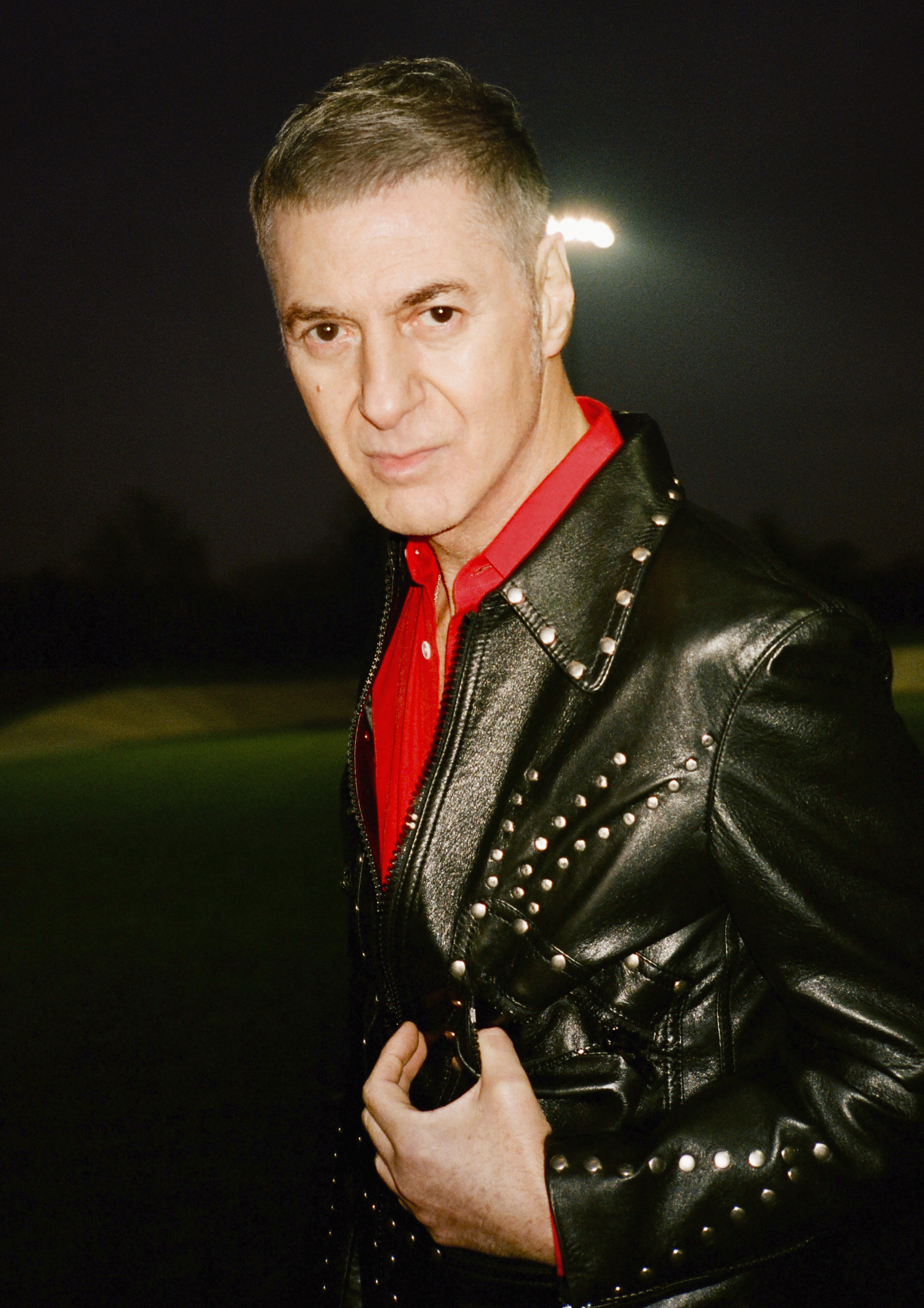
French actor and singer Etienne Daho wearing Americana-inspired black leather blouson and red western shirt in 2023.

From 2023 to 2024, red, white, and blue were the main colors in the UK, Australia, France, and the US. Western shirts with pearl snaps returned to fashion, often made of denim, black gabardine, or bright madras plaid. These shirts sometimes had contrasting yokes and cuffs with detailed embroidery.Popular clothing included moccasins, stonewash denim waistcoats with decorative fringes, preppy loafers, navy blue suits and sportcoats, Wrangler jeans, or Levi's jeans. Suede fringe jackets became trendy, influenced by celebrities like Pharrell Williams, Noel Fielding, Post Malone, and Beyoncé, especially with her upcoming Cowboy Carter album.

Straight leg jeans replaced skinny jeans, which were popular from the late 2000s to the mid-2010s. Other fashion items included stetsons, white baseball jerseys with bold red or blue pinstripes, and striped blue neckties. Baggy white pants, Union Jack motifs, Panhandle Slim, Rockmount, and Scully sport coats with contrasting Western-inspired yokes and embroidery also gained popularity. Barrel jeans, duster coats like those seen in the Yellowstone TV series, preppy college sweaters, and retro blue and white striped football shirts were fashionable. Chelsea boots with cowboy boot styling, two-button blazers with red and blue boating stripes, V-neck sweater vests, and royal blue baseball jackets with white sleeves also appeared frequently. Howler Brothers gilets, shirts, and suits worn open to show the chest, along with boxy leather reefer jackets, were popular in both the UK and the US.

==== Eclectic grandpa ====
The "grandpacore" fashion trend of 2024, also known as "eclectic grandpa", is characterized by vintage-inspired casual fashion from the late 1940s to early 1960s. It draws inspiration from the fashion sensibilities of grandfathers from the silent generation and incorporates colorful knitwear like knit polo shirts or camp collar shirts, braces, loafer shoes, dress socks, wide pleated pants, and various tweed accessories, especially flat caps. Celebrities such as Harry Styles, Jacob Elordi, Timothee Chalamet, and Tyler, the Creator have played a significant role in popularizing this trend among the mainstream fashion public in the UK and the US.

In the summer, grandpacore style takes on a relaxed, beach-inspired look with light linen camp collar shirts, pleated shorts, boat shoes, and striped polo shirts. Beaded jewelry is often added as a simple accessory. This version stays true to vintage style while being comfortable for warm weather. Around the same time, aquatic-themed fashion also began to grow in popularity during the mid-2020s, bringing ocean colors, shell details, and sea-inspired patterns into everyday wear.

==== Mid-century modern formalwear ====
The "mid-century modern" inspired formal wear trend of fall 2025 featured black, navy blue, dark grey and ecru double breasted wool sport coats, and baggy, high waisted pants inspired by Dior's 1954 menswear collection. The 1950s to early 60s inspired styling was marketed in Britain and America by contemporary brands like Jasper Conran, Moss Bros, Charles Tyrwhitt, Louis Vuitton, or Ralph Lauren. Unlike the slim-fitting Italian inspired suits of the 2010s, men's suits of the 2020s were less form fitting and featured looser pants. Black and checked suits declined in popularity in favor of charcoal, mid grey, light grey, navy blue pinstripe and beige, as was previously popular in the early 2000s. Common accessories included cashmere wool scarfs in neutral tones like white or ecru, loafers, chelsea boots and flat caps inspired by Peaky Blinders. At black tie events in America the colorful velvet tuxedos of the early 2020s declined in popularity and were replaced with more conservative colors such as black, white or midnight blue.

== Youth fashion ==
=== E-Kid and Alternative Fashion ===
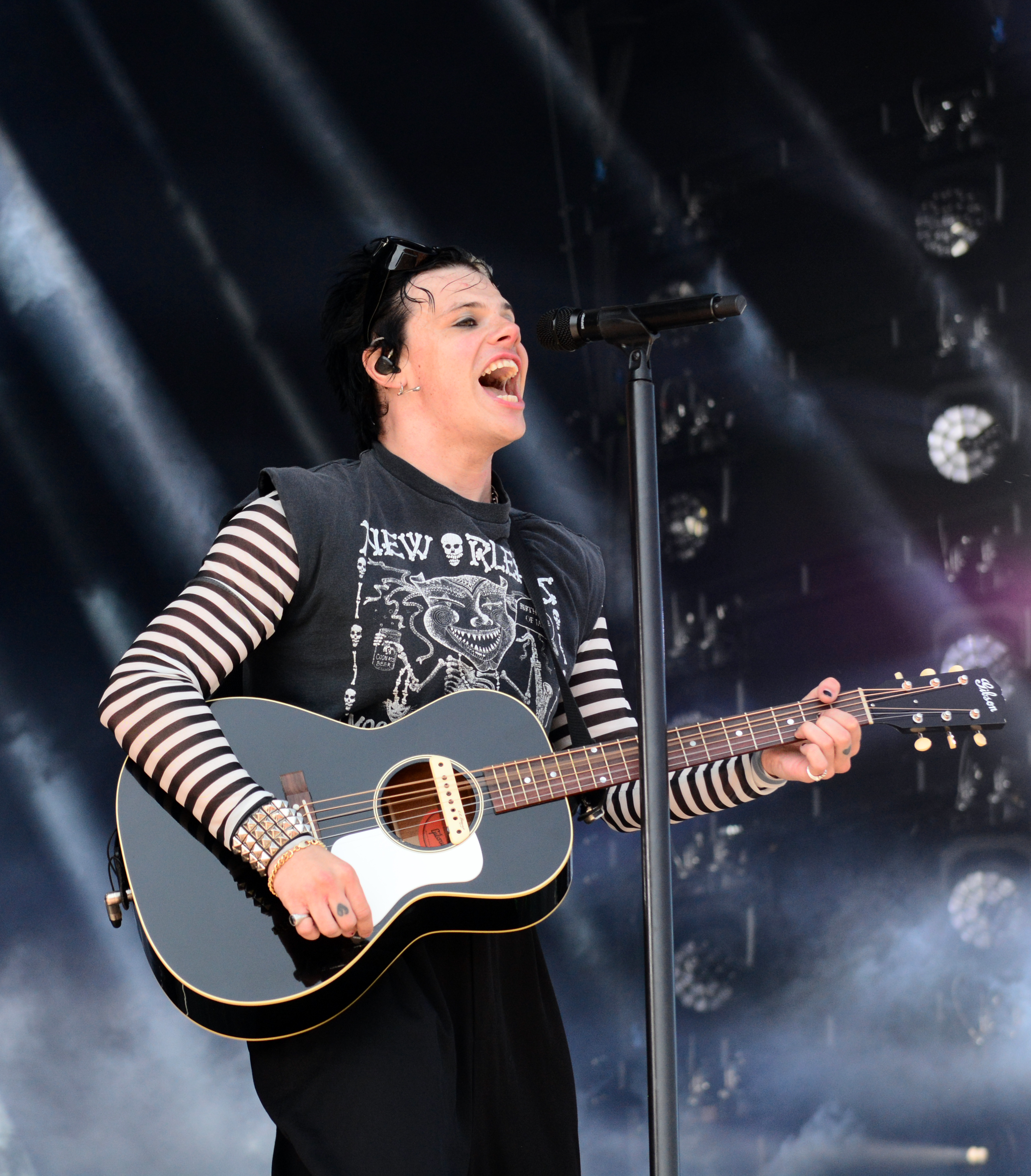
Androgynous outfit worn by alternative singer Yungblud in 2023

In the early 2020s, alternative fashion drew on past subcultures like emo, pop punk, goth, and scene, as well as Japanese street style and emerging genres like hyperpop, nu metal, shoegaze, and rage music.

Alternative music fans from the UK and the US often wore graphic t-shirts, platform boots, fishnet tights, BDSM collars, bold eye makeup, dark colors with neon accents, and hi-top sneakers like Vans or Converse All Stars. Layered clothing, such as oversized t-shirts or jackets, was paired with studded belts, tripp pants, and skull jewelry.

Brands like Ed Hardy, Hot Topic, and Affliction, which were popular in the late 2000s, made a return, integrating past fashion trends with contemporary preferences. These styles were shared on platforms like TikTok and YouTube, where users blended nostalgia with current trends, creating a fashion movement that reflected both historical and modern cultural influences. The pop-punk revival of early 2020s saw artists like Machine Gun Kelly and Yungblud influenced by the e-boy look, blending alterative fashion with their music.

Hairstyles were frequently androgynous and colorful, taking inspiration from late 2000s scene fashion and sometimes featuring anime inspired accessories like animal ears and tails (called kemonomimi).

=== Hip-hop and Opium ===
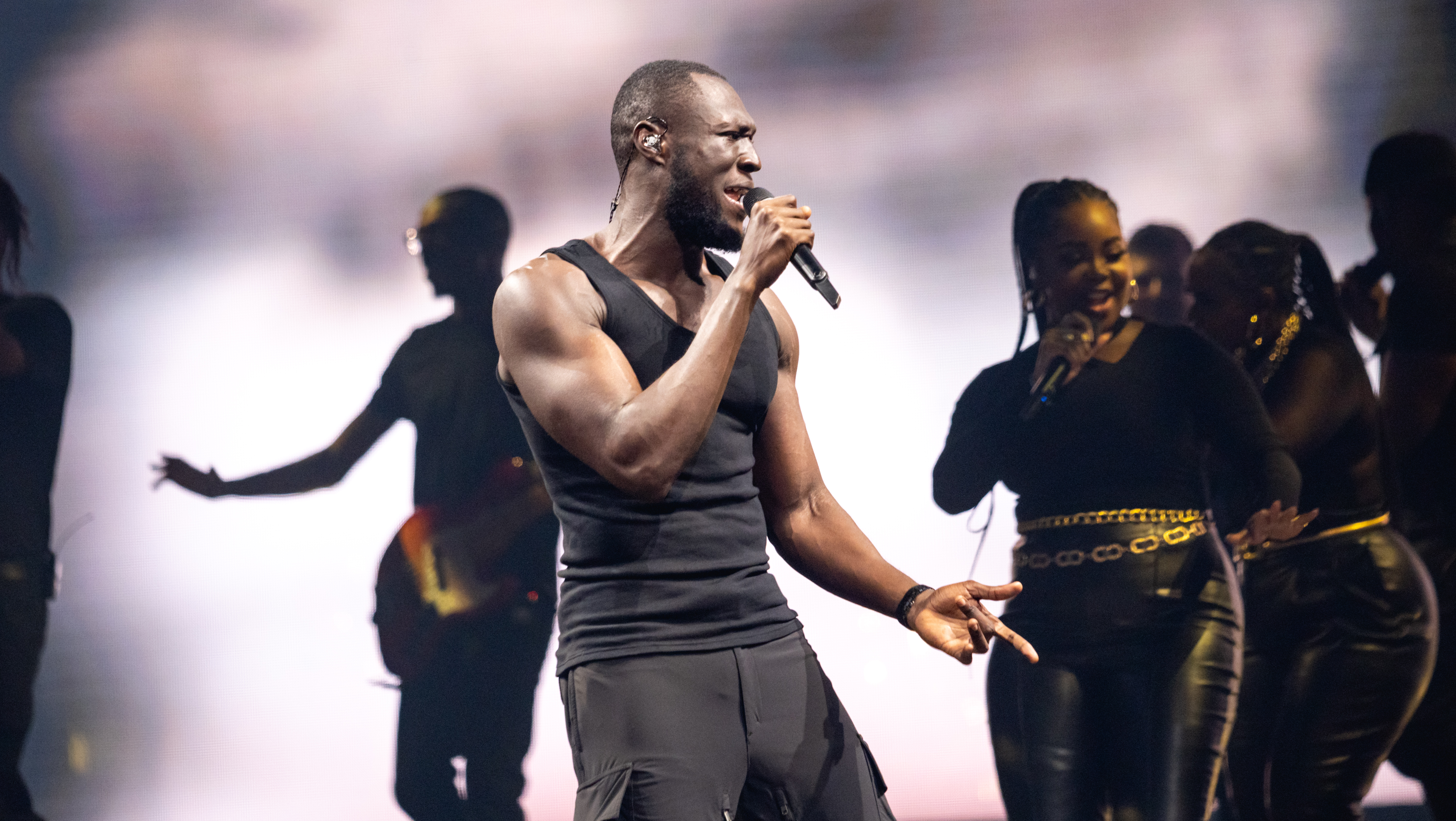
British rapper Stormzy wearing all-black outfit in 2022.

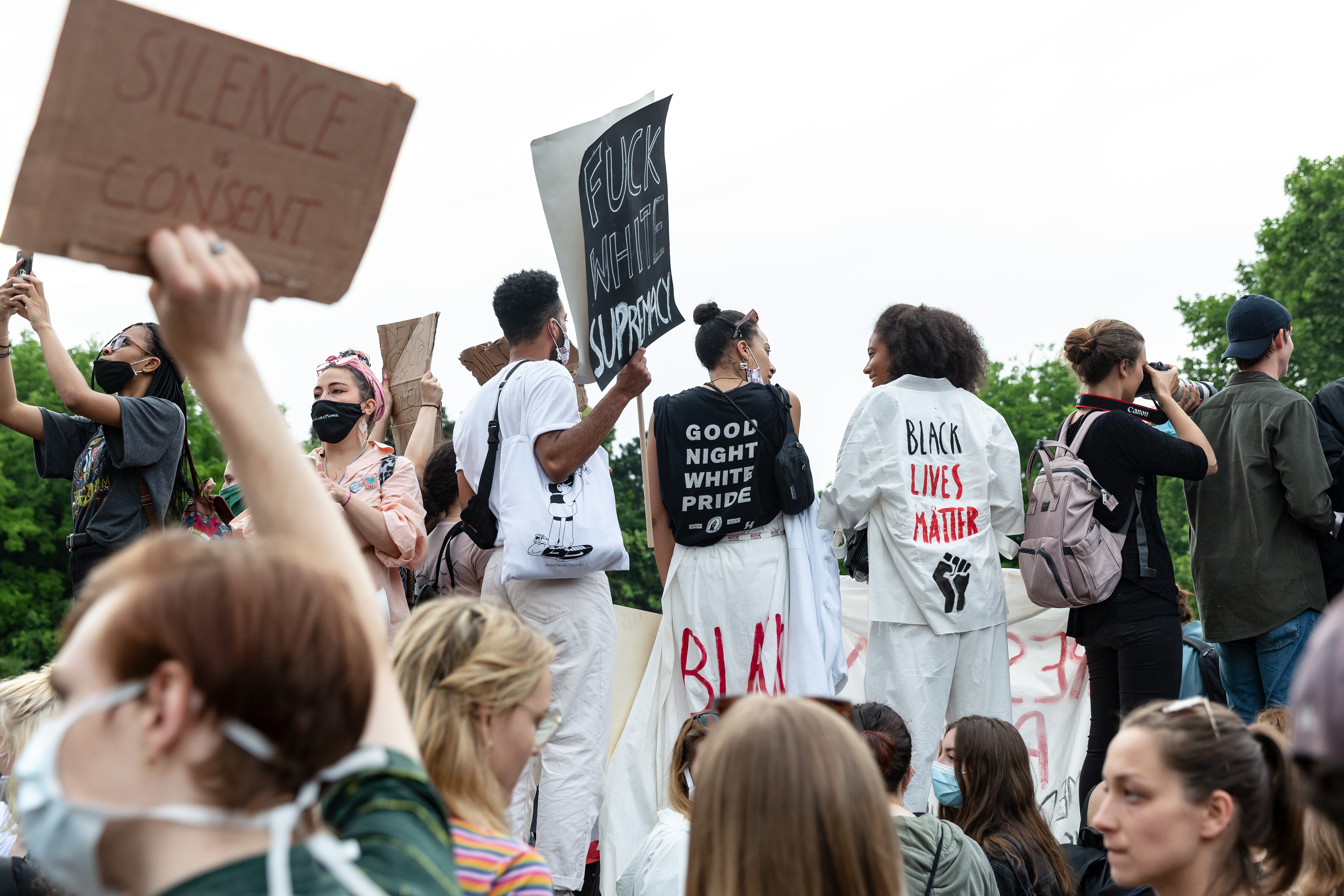
Clothing items used to express beliefs during a Black Lives Matter protest.

Hip-hop clothing is an umbrella term for a variety of styles influenced by hip-hop and trap music. Throughout the 2020s, streetwear fashion was a continued presence in mainstream culture, incorporating elements from designer fashion, athleisure, and vintage clothing. It drew inspiration from 2000s fashion, blending casual, functional pieces with luxury and expressive details. The style often featured comfortable items like hoodies, sweatpants, and graphic tees, with high-end collaborations and distinct textures and silhouettes.

For Black American and Black British youth, hip hop fashion has become more about political statements. This change is influenced by social justice rappers like Stormzy and Noname, the Black Lives Matter movement, and renewed interest in civil rights groups like the Black Panther Party. Popular items include slogan T-shirts inspired by punk fashion, black leather jackets or trench coats, hoodies, black sweatpants, face-covering black bandanas, dark glasses, marijuana motifs, skull masks, morale patches, paramilitary tactical vests, and camouflage patterns. In the American South, Black activists have worn blue Union Army kepis while taking down Confederate statues to challenge Lost Cause revisionists and white supremacists.

The Opium aesthetic emerged as a subculture within the Rage music scene, heavily influenced by artists such as Playboi Carti, Ken Carson, and Destroy Lonely, who were associated with the Opium record label. This style combined high fashion with monochromatic clothing and hip-hop fashion, drawing inspiration from avant-garde designers like Rick Owens, Raf Simons and Jerry Lorenzo and other similarly unconventional fashion labels. The aesthetic was characterized by luxury items, including oversized leather jackets, pants, black and silver jewelry, and garments with unconventional silhouettes that emphasized bold silhouettes. BDSM-inspired details, such as chains and harnesses, were frequently incorporated into outfits, creating a striking visual style that contrasted with more mainstream fashion trends.

=== Soft grunge and kidcore ===
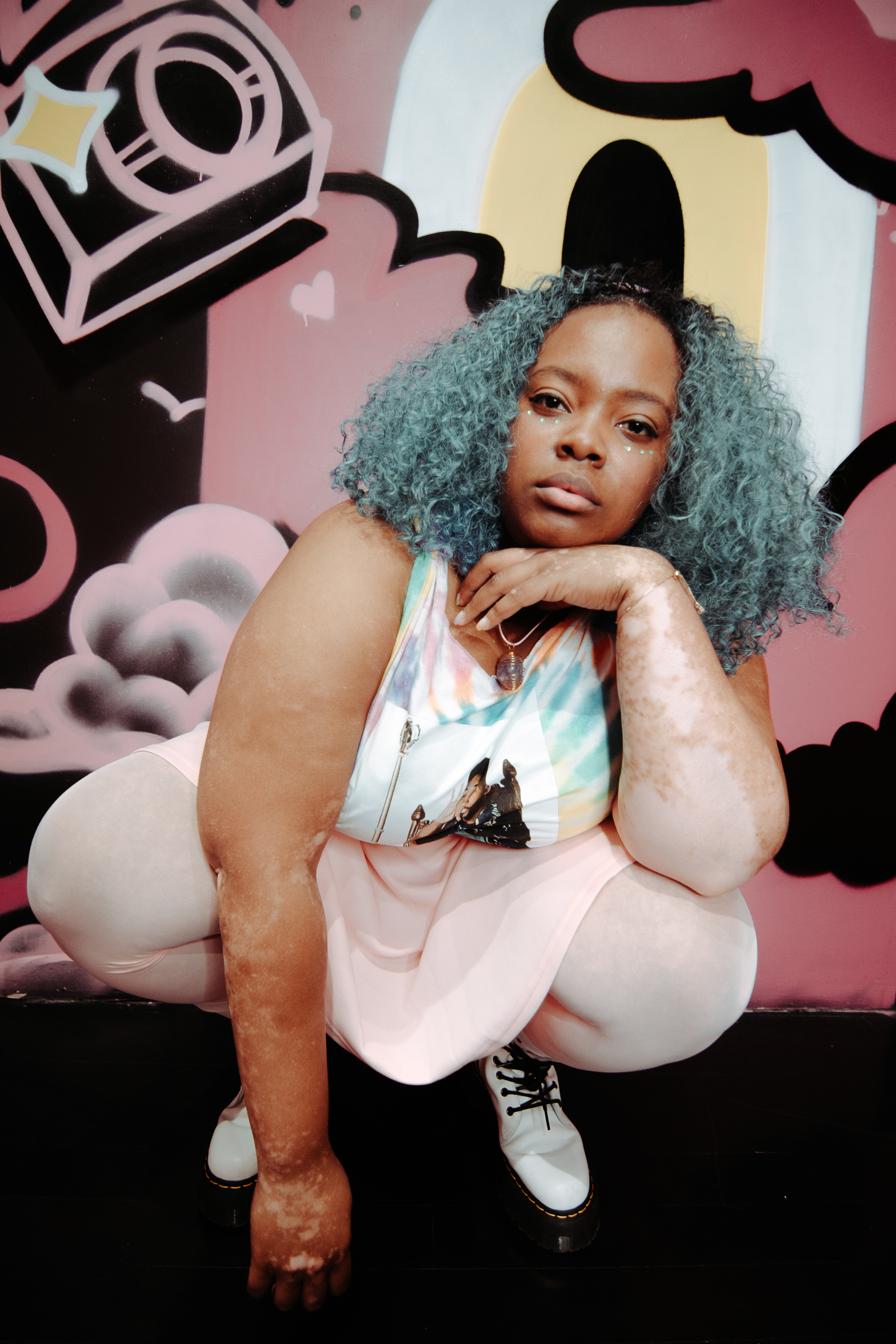
2021: Black American woman with a kidcore-inspired outfit and brightly dyed hair in 2021.

In the early 2020s, American indie kids adopted a youthful aesthetic, taking cues from Japanese kid-core subculture, indie pop, energy drinks, and skater fashion. Indie teenagers claimed to reject fast fashion, turning to thrift stores like Goodwill to find items such as tennis skirts, sweater vests, cow print, mom jeans, crop tops, oversized hoodies and cardigans, Doc Martens, and other eclectic pieces like shortalls, bucket hats, shoestring belts, and fuzzy bags. Despite the anti-consumerist message, much of the clothing embraced by this style was actually produced by fast fashion companies like Shein and AliExpress.

Individuals who influenced this trend include indie rapper Russ and Australian rapper The Kid Laroi. Critics criticized the anti-conformist and environmentally friendly trend, which involved reselling cheap second-hand clothing at inflated prices.

Around 2022, the soft grunge fashion style of the early to mid–2010s began to experience a resurgence in popularity due to videos uploaded on TikTok. By August of that year, the hashtags "2014 Tumblr","Grunge Aesthetic," and "Tumblr Aesthetic" accumulated millions of views. Harper's Bazaar's writer Ella Sangster credited the revival as a reaction against the clean girl aesthetic which had been prominent on the same platform since 2020. The same year, luxury fashion house Ports 1961 launched their fall/winter 2022 campaign which featured models Vittoria Ceretti and Bella Hadid in soft grunge inspired outfits taken on polaroid cameras. During this time, the style was embraced by celebrities including Emma Chamberlain, Doja Cat and Olivia Rodrigo.

=== Indie sleaze and Indie Rock ===
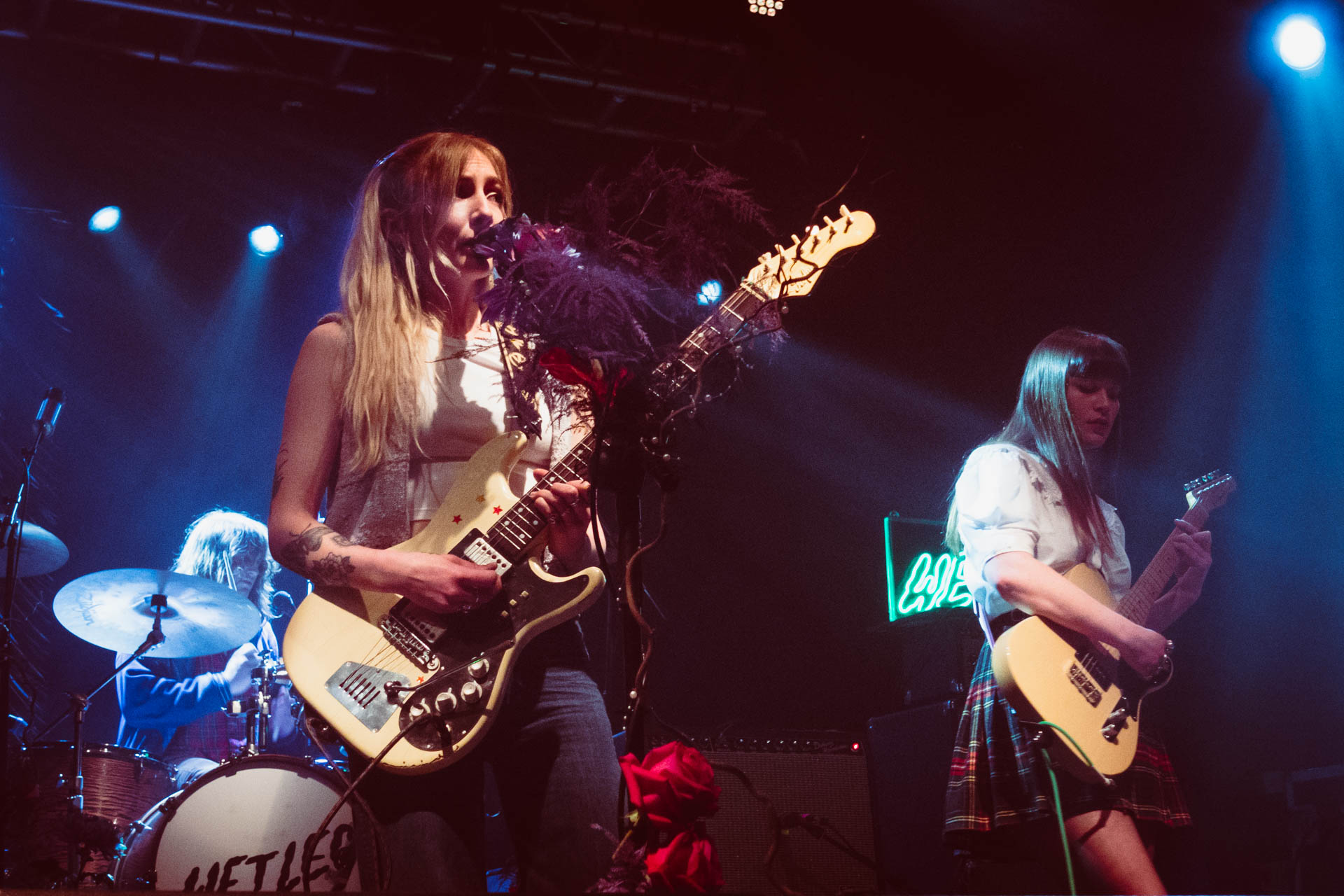
Maximalist outfits worn by indie girl group Wet Leg, 2022.

The indie sleaze revival of the 2020s draws inspiration from the American Apparel-aesthetic and the late 2000s indie electronic and electroclash scenes. It features skin-baring late 2000s style clothing including miniskirts, smudged eyeliner, Lime Green, crop tops, above the knee spaghetti or slip dresses with capped sleeved tees or capped sleeved bodysuits underneath both especially in white and high-waisted shorts. The look embraces rebellious aesthetics, often paired with chunky boots, leather jackets, and dark makeup. The Dare had a notable influence on this trend, contributing to the DIY, unapologetic vibe. Charli XCX also plays a role in the resurgence, with her albums Brat and Brat Summer reflecting this experimental approach to fashion. The style channels the chaotic, edgy energy of the indie electronic era.

In contrast to the brightly colored, childlike outfits popular in the US, and the mismatched clothing previously worn ironically by hipsters during the 2010s, British indie pop fans favored a darker, more authentic post-punk and garage rock-inspired aesthetic. Critics have compared the early 2020s indie rock revival, with its 1960s- and Noughties-inspired outfits, to the original British Invasion.

Members of the UK indie subculture mixed thrift store clothing from the mid-2000s to early 2010s with vintage items and new clothes made in retro 1960s styles by brands like Madcap England. Artists such as Sam Fender, Wet Leg, The Lathums, Years & Years, and Wolf Alice made styles like velvet or paisley tuxedo jackets popular. They also wore dark-wash slim-fit jeans, striped polo shirts with cardigans, white T-shirts, and black leather jackets.

Common accessories included bucket hats, plaid or black miniskirts, dresses with red or black polka dots, and striped throwback football shirts, especially favored by Sam Fender. Other items included blouses, Argyle golfing sweaters, Prince of Wales check sport coats. Their outfits often featured checked western shirts, ripped jeans, red Doc Martens, suede Beatle boots with pointed toes, bowling shoes, brothel creepers, and parkas.

=== Old money, preppy and dark academia ===
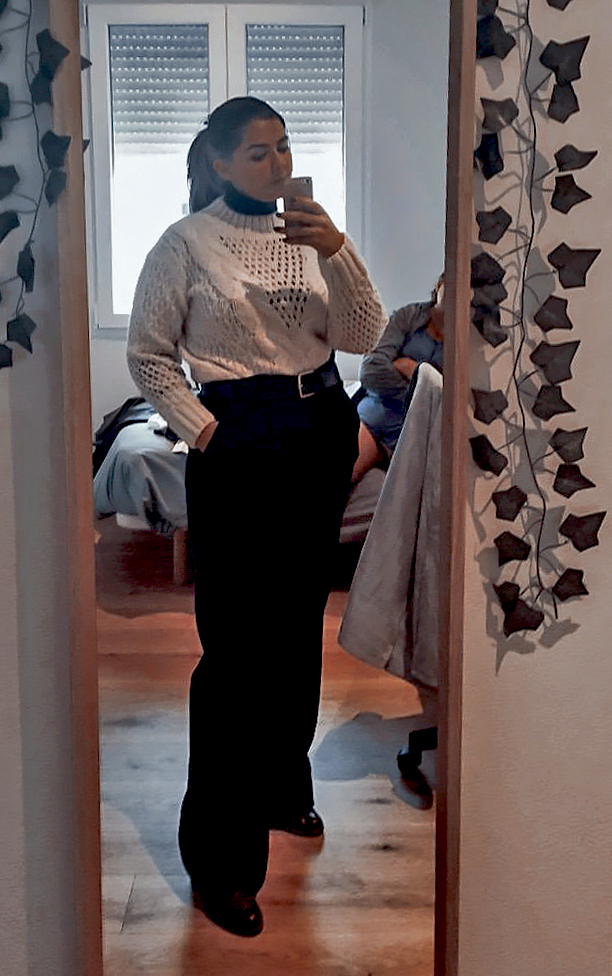
2020: example of a Dark Academia outfit.

The dark academia or old money aesthetic of the early to mid 2020s, which combined elements of preppy fashion and gothic fashion, was heavily influenced by 1930s and 1940s fashion, particularly attire worn by students at Oxbridge, Ivy League colleges, and prep schools during the time.

Oversized cardigan sweaters, oxford blue rowing blazers with contrasting white trim, dress shirts, plaid skirts, dark turtleneck sweaters, tights, knee socks, Oxford shoes, leather satchels, ballet flats, white sneakers, twill jogger pants, and apparel made of houndstooth, and dark grey or brown tweed sport coats are some of the most identified articles of clothing with the "dark academia" aka "bookcore" aesthetic. The typical color palette consisted primarily of black, white, beige, browns, dark green, and occasional navy.

A closely related style, known as "light academia", was characterized by neutral and light colors, including soft blues, pinks, whites, creamy yellows, beige, light greys, light purple, pastel and dusty colors, plaid, stripes, and argyle patterns reminiscent of the preppy look of the early 1980s. Variants to this style, which originated in America as an internet trend, included "pastel academia," "romantic academia," and "chaotic academia".

Preppy girls appropriated the VSCO style during the early to mid 2020s, although their style had very little in connection with the original definition of preppy. Lululemon and Zara clothes are essentials for achieving this look. Brands such as Brandy Melville, Nike and H&M were also popular.

=== Goblincore, fairy grunge, coquette ===
Goblincore and cottagecore are closely related subcultures that combine nature-inspired clothing with a vintage, worn-in vibe. Key items include oversized sweaters, cardigans, loose blouses, long skirts, floral dresses, and overalls.

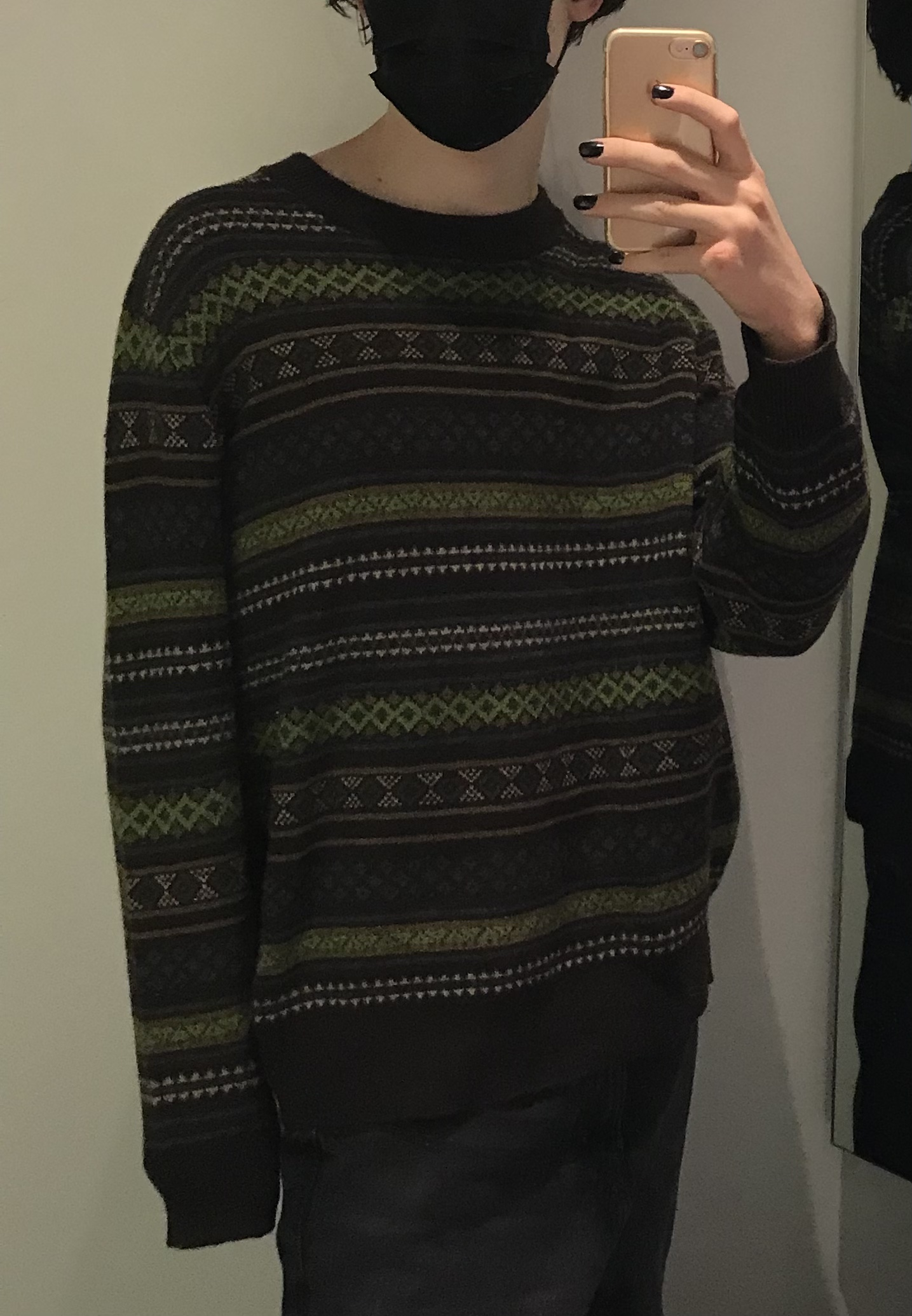
Goblincore sweater

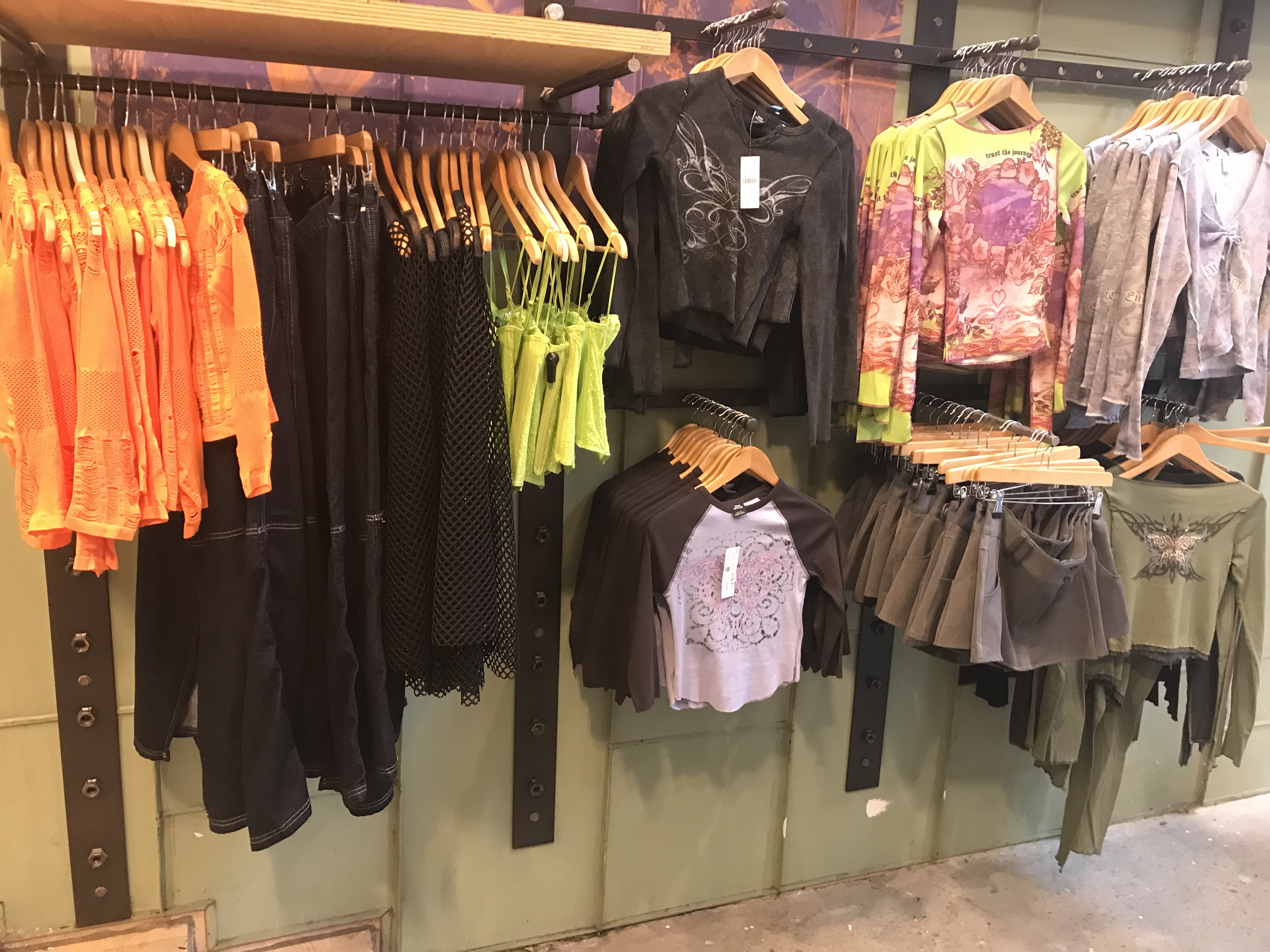
Fairy Grunge clothing at an Urban Outfitters store

Fairy grunge combined the aesthetics of fairycore, coquette, and grunge. Social media creators were mostly responsible for popularizing this aesthetic. Fairy grunge can be seen as a natural extension of the kinderwhore style — which has deep roots in grunge, but with a more ethereal note. Fairy grunge often included oversized t-shirts or hoodies, long or miniskirts, nightgowns, corsets, mittens, gloves, skull patterns, mesh tights or fishnets, high knee socks, leg warmers, platform Demonia shoes, fairy wings, and elf ears.

Nymphet, also known as coquette, is an aesthetic that draws on a character cliché first used by Vladimir Nabokov in his 1955 novel Lolita and its two subsequent film adaptations (1962 and 1997). Heart-shaped sunglasses, pastel colors, floral/cherry patterns, ballet shoes, hair bows, pigtails and lace dresses are essential to achieving the coquette look. Musician Lana Del Rey is cited to be a style icon and helped popularize the nymphet aesthetic for Gen Z women. Coquette has been criticized by some writers, such as Iustina Roman, for the glamorization of eating disorders, pedophilia, racism, and classism.

=== Barbiecore, McBling, and gyaru ===
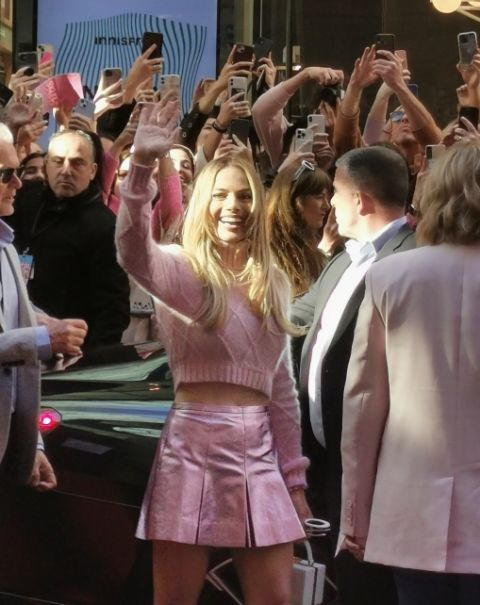
All pink Barbiecore inspired outfit worn by actress Margot Robbie in 2023

Barbiecore, also known as bimbocore, is a fashion style inspired by the Barbie doll. It became popular in 2022 and 2023, especially following the release of the Barbie movie. The aesthetic featured a color palette with bright pinks, including hot pink, as well as pastels, white, and metallics. The fashion included fitted dresses, miniskirts, and crop tops, often made from shiny fabrics like satin and glitter. Accessories like oversized sunglasses, platform shoes, and bold jewelry were also common. The movement represented the feminist themes seen in the movie. A visually similar, but distinct Japanese subculture, known as Gyaru, dates back to the late 1990s.

The Barbiecore style acts as a meta-ironic parody of the mid-2000s to early 2010s millennial girlboss feminism, acknowledging that they are appealing to heteronormative feminine beauty standards and sexist stereotypes, while being trans-inclusive and sex-positive. Pro-sex work and pro-women's rights, Bimbocore gained popularity in leftist TikTok communities. McBling, a similar aesthetic, was commonly mislabeled as Y2K. Millennial pink as worn by Margot Robbie in the Barbie film, rhinestones, small handbags, large sunglasses, and pop music define this aesthetic.

Barbiecore or Bimbocore was criticized for glamorizing the sugar baby lifestyle, bimbo feminism and adult platforms such as OnlyFans, but that did not end the movement's popularity with Gen Z. McBling has also been thoroughly criticized for racism, whitewashing, classism, and fatphobia.

=== Gorpcore ===
Gorpcore is a style that emerged in the late 2010s and early 2020s, coined by Jason Chen in 2017. Gorpcore incorporates tech-based, loose-fitting outdoorsy and camping-chic inspired styles. A significant part of this style category is defined by the earthy and muted tones often found in the range of gear included in the trend, such as olive green, khaki, beige-grey marl, and horizon blue. The style reuses and incorporates style inspirations from previous style generations and similar outdoorsy styles. The style is somewhat open for interpretation because it is fairly new, making it flexible and creative, although certain patterns and forms often help classify an outfit as gorp.

Brands associated with the gorpcore aesthetic include Arc'teryx, Patagonia, and The North Face, although secondhand, sustainable clothing from vintage shops, thrift stores, and online stores like Depop, Etsy or Thred-up is also widespread. The trend is considered by many to be elitist, and often the brands associated are premium brands with high price tags out of range for average wage. Apparel pieces that make up the trend include down jackets, body warmers, anoraks, utilitarian Eagle Creek and Osprey rucksacks, crew neck and v-neck t-shirts with zipper pockets, utility pants, moisture-wicking trekking shirts with short sleeves and snap fasteners, knit caps, big headphones and racer-glasses.

The style is unisex, reflecting how people search for new ways to incorporate previously underutilized categories of utilitarian outdoor activity-related clothing into modern urban settings.

=== Jirai Kei ===
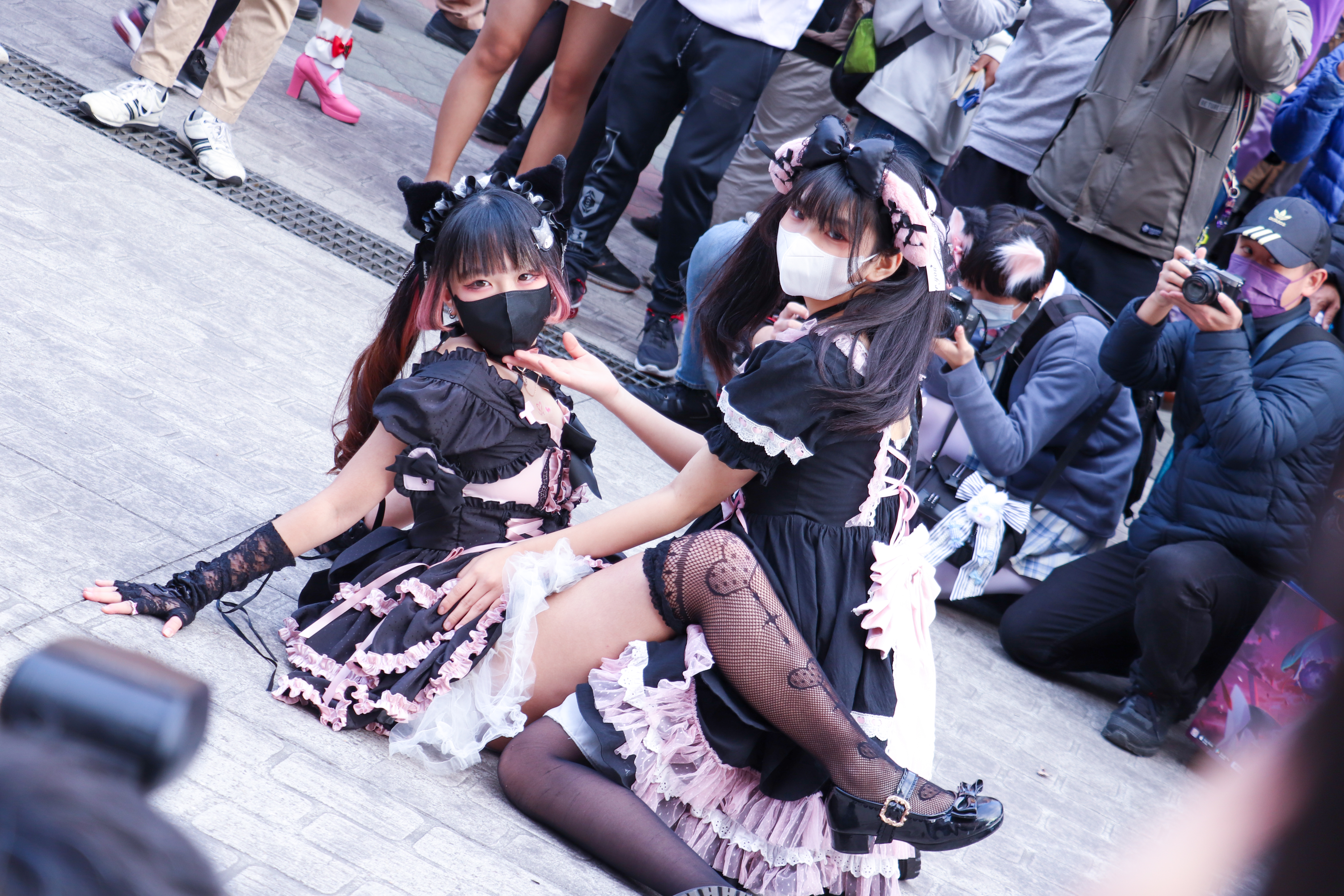
Two women with Jirai Kei outfit, 2023

Jirai Kei, literally means "landmine type", is a fashion subculture originating from Japan's Kabukichō and spread in popularity in the early 2020s. The fashion incorporates dark and kawaii styles. Described as similar to Lolita and preppy fashions in clothing, it's often paired with accessories with bow, heart, cross, and lace elements. Platform shoes are another prominent feature of Jirai Kei fashion. The primary colors in Jirai Kei are black, white, and pale pink. Jirai Meiku (meaning "mine makeup") is a related makeup style that makes the eyes look red and swollen, and the skin look white or almost translucent. Kuromi and My Melody from Sanrio are regarded as popular mascots of Jirai Kei. Jirai Kei fashion has been met by widespread social prejudice, directed towards those who wear Jirai Kei and their lifestyle choices.

== Hairstyles ==
=== Women's hairstyles ===
Due to the restrictions on hair salons during the lockdowns, many women grew out their hair or watched tutorials to do their own hair. Popular styles included curtain bangs, 1980s, 1990s and early 2000s-inspired bangs, hair extensions, ponytails, twin pigtails, French braid, shaggy hair commonly known as the "wolf cut", and natural hair for Black American women. Along with these hairstyles, 1960s-inspired beehive hairdos were popularized by British pop singers Emily Capell and Joy Crookes Early 2000s fashion-inspired straightened and brightly dyed hair was made popular by Doja Cat and Billie Eilish from 2021 to 2022.

In the early and mid 2020s, common hair accessories included pearl and sequin hair clips, headbands, bandanas and scrunchies. During the lockdowns of 2020–21, some women in the UK, the US, and Asia experimented with DIY hairstyles at home, including the bob cut, the crop, the partially shaved head, bangs, and the pixie cut.

From 2023 onwards, a longer straightened version of the bob cut, sometimes dyed blonde, became popular among middle-class women in the UK and the US. In 2024, ultra-long hairstyles made a comeback.

=== Men's hairstyles ===
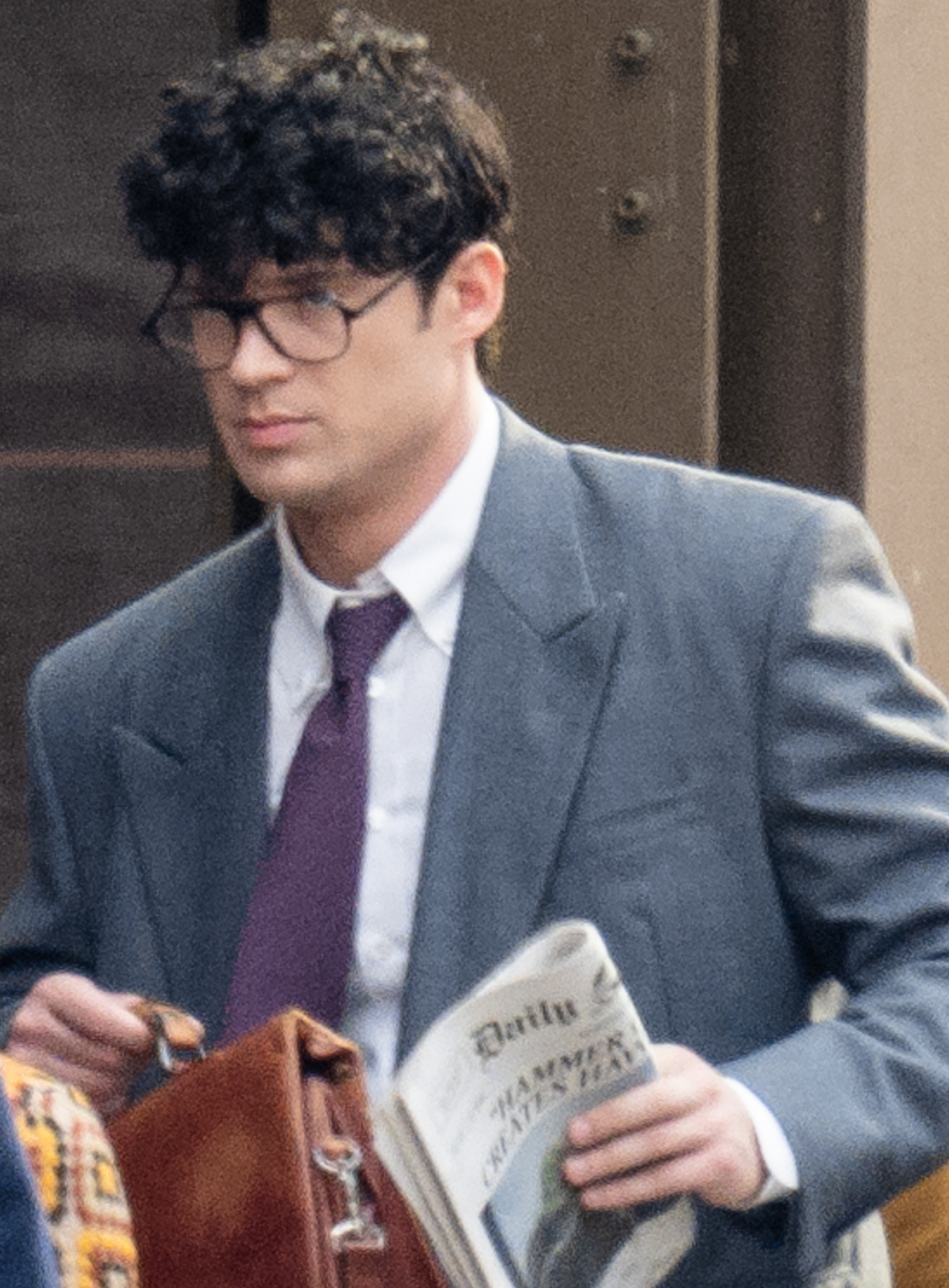
The broccoli haircut features short sides and a curly top from David Corenswet as Clark Kent during Superman.

By 2020, the popularity of full beards associated with hipster subculture declined in many regions, except in parts of the Middle East, Africa, Eastern Europe, and Latin America. In Western countries, beards were generally kept short to highlight facial features and accommodate the use of masks.

Popular styles included curtain bangs, permed hair (referred to as the "broccoli haircut" by Generation Z), the "wet mop," mullets (particularly in the US and Australia), the "Edgar cut," and shaggy hair. This revival was partially influenced by the closure of barbershops in the UK and the US during the COVID-19 pandemic.

Many younger Black American men opted for natural hair from 2021 onwards, especially the skin fade, textured Caesar cut and short versions of the afro or dreadlocks combined with an undercut. Meanwhile, many balding men in the UK, the US, and Ireland continued to get buzzcuts at home during the lockdown. Young males began growing mustaches in the summer of 2022, partially inspired by Miles Teller's role in Top Gun: Maverick.

By 2025 the mod haircut and large sideburns had made a comeback among younger guys in London, Northern England, the Eastern US, and parts of Australia due to a resurgence of interest in 2000s indie rock and 1990s Britpop groups like Oasis. At the same time, quiffs, buzzcuts, the caesar cut AKA "TikTok hair", and permed hair like the "Broccoli haircut" remained popular.

== Cosmetics trends ==
=== Skincare ===
Gen Alpha's interest in skincare continued the skincare boom that started in the late 2010s and carried into the next decade. As Gen Z and Millennials focused on taking care of their skin, Gen Alpha joined in by following skincare routines that helped keep their skin healthy. The popularity of social media platforms like TikTok played a big role in this uptick, as many young users discovered new skincare products and tips through videos and trends. With more products available for different skin types, the trend kept growing, and social media became a place for sharing skincare advice. This helped keep the skincare trend strong, with Gen Alpha playing a big part in shaping how the beauty industry evolved.

One of the most talked-about trends in skincare was "slugging," where people applied a thick layer of petroleum jelly on their face to keep moisture in and protect their skin. Along with this, wearing sunscreen every day became accepted as an important method to protect the skin from the sun, while vitamin C serums were used to brighten the skin and even out spots. Many also used retinol to help reduce fine lines and make their skin smoother. Another popular trend was gua sha, a technique from China that involves gently scraping one's face with a smooth stone to help with blood flow and relaxation. People also started using rice water to treat their hair, a practice from Asia believed to make hair healthier and stronger. Finally, some young people started using baby Botox, which involves small amounts of Botox to prevent wrinkles before they appear.

=== Makeup ===
In the early 2020s, there was a cultural shift away from the bold, drag-inspired makeup of the late 2010s. In contrast to the previous decade's trends, the "clean girl" look became popular, especially among Gen Z and Gen Alpha. This style moved away from thick eyebrows, colorful eyeshadows, and matte foundations, focusing instead on a more moisturized dewy makeup look that appealed to mainstream America. The clean girl look evolved from the "model off-duty" style of the previous decade. It gained popularity in the early 2020s, with models like Bella Hadid, Hailey Bieber and Lily-Rose Depp leading the trend. The style featured slicked-back hair, nude eyeshadow, fluffy brows, dewy skin, bleached eyebrows, liquid blush, and glossy lips, aiming for a casual, effortless appearance that resonated with the relaxed aesthetic favored by Gen Z and Gen Alpha. The style focused on appearing effortlessly flawless and casual, adapting all the fashion trends from the early 2020s and giving them a muted tonal color palette and a sexy, carefree attitude. The strong emphasis on skincare, diet, and exercise made the clean girl not only a fashion statement but a lifestyle as well, similar to her 1960s predecessor. The aesthetic has been criticized for cultural appropriation, toxic positivity, and fatphobia, which affected its mainstream popularity.

The maximalist graphic eyeliner trend of 2022 allowed British and American women to emphasize their eyes with vibrant colors and geometric designs. Graphic eyeliner made headlines and introduced women to new methods to experiment with facial makeup.

The return of Donald Trump to the U.S. presidency in 2025 led progressive TikTok influencer Suzanne Lambert to identify a look that came to be called "Republican makeup" and post a mock tutorial explaining how to do it, calling for use of poorly blended foundation mismatching the wearer's skin tones (usually on the darker side), heavy eyeliner and mascara, and unfilled lips. Other influencers followed suit.

=== Tattoos ===
From 2021 onwards, new tattoo styles emerged among younger trendsetters. Popular trends included colorful modern reinterpretations of traditional Japanese tattoos, psychedelic art, tramp stamps, minimalist black and white portraits, lightning bolts, fine art, pop culture mashups, holograms, and dot work. Other popular tattoo designs included spiritual meanings such as representations of the Buddha, Hindu mandalas, and the tree of life. Tribal tattoos and hyperrealistic portraits of loved ones popular during the 2010s declined.

=== Body modifications ===
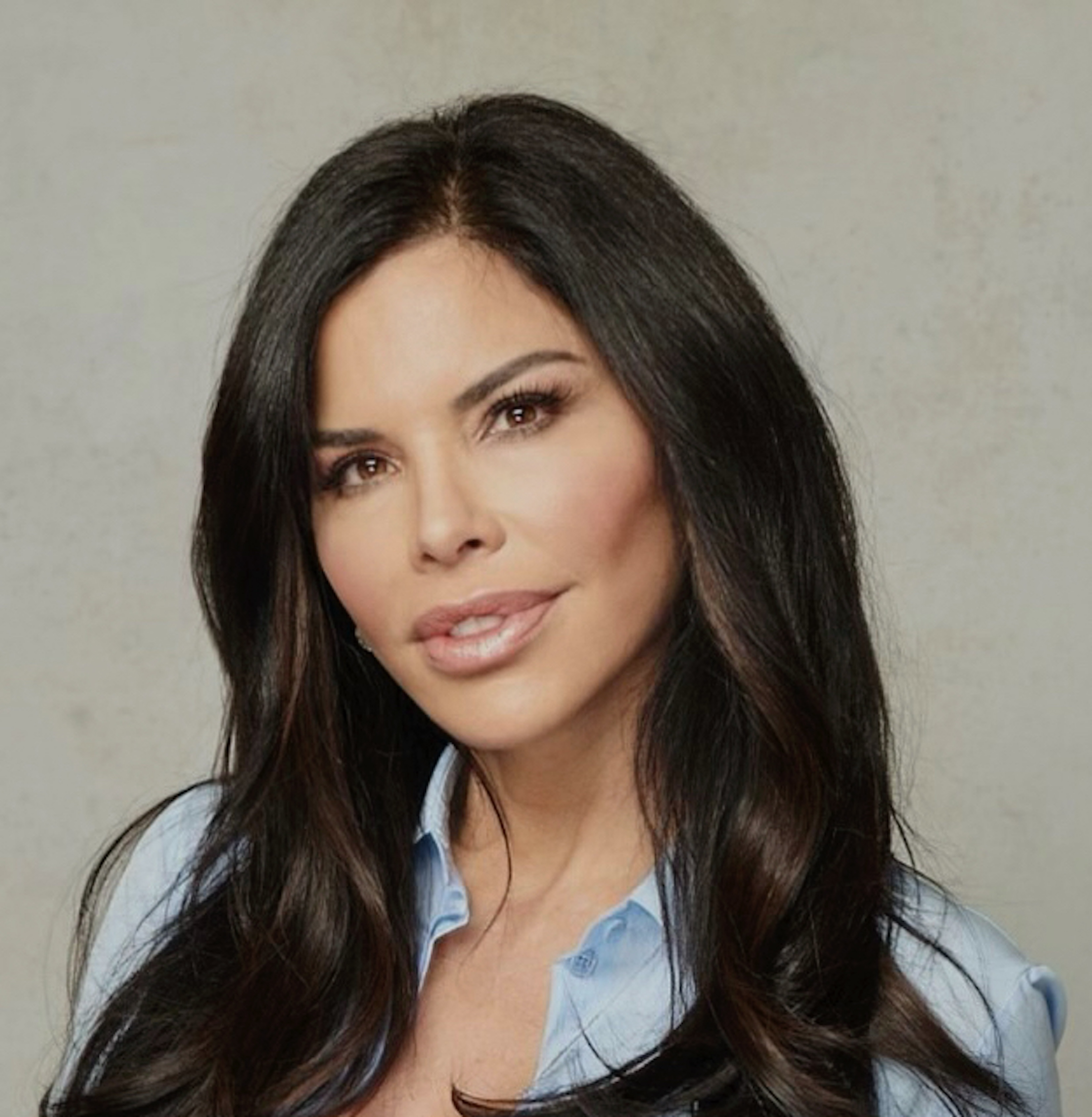
Lauren Sánchez exhibiting Mar-a-Lago face in 2022

The Brazilian butt lift is a gluteal fat grafting procedure that utilizes excess fat collected from other body areas to add buttock volume and projection or adjust overall shape and symmetry. The Brazilian butt lift reached its peak media coverage in 2021, when it was declared to be "the world's most dangerous cosmetic surgery", with news headlines discussing the procedure's risks and fatalities following the procedure.

The "fox eye lift" in particular, was a contentious cosmetic trend because of the strong racial connotations associated with giving someone an oriental eye shape. The concept of a positive canthal tilt became a topic of discussion for men and women, due to social media platforms such as TikTok.

Another widespread trend of the early and mid 2020s was "Turkey teeth", so-called because people had the procedure done in Turkey due to the lower cost of dental care. Unlike in previous decades, when dental crowns and dental implants were fitted to badly decayed teeth, many patients from the UK and the US had their healthy teeth ground into pegs for the caps.

=== Eyewear ===
The early to mid 2020s saw the return of many retro stylings of eyewear in the US such as cat eyeglasses, aviator sunglasses, rimless glasses, and round frame eyeglasses for both men and women. 1960s fashion inspired glasses with clear and transparent frames had become common in this decade as well.

== Exhibitions ==
=== 2020 ===
- "About Time: Fashion and Duration" October 26 until February 7, 2021, at the Costume Institute at the Metropolitan Museum of Art in New York City.

=== 2021 ===
- In America: A Lexicon of Fashion at the Costume Institute at the Metropolitan Museum of Art in New York City

=== 2022 ===
- "Fashioning Masculinities: The Art of Menswear" March 19 until November 6, 2022, at Victoria and Albert Museum in London
- "Africa Fashion" July 2 - April 16, 2023 at Victoria and Albert Museum in London

=== 2023 ===
- "DIVA" June 2023 - April 2024 at Victoria and Albert Museum in London

== Gallery ==
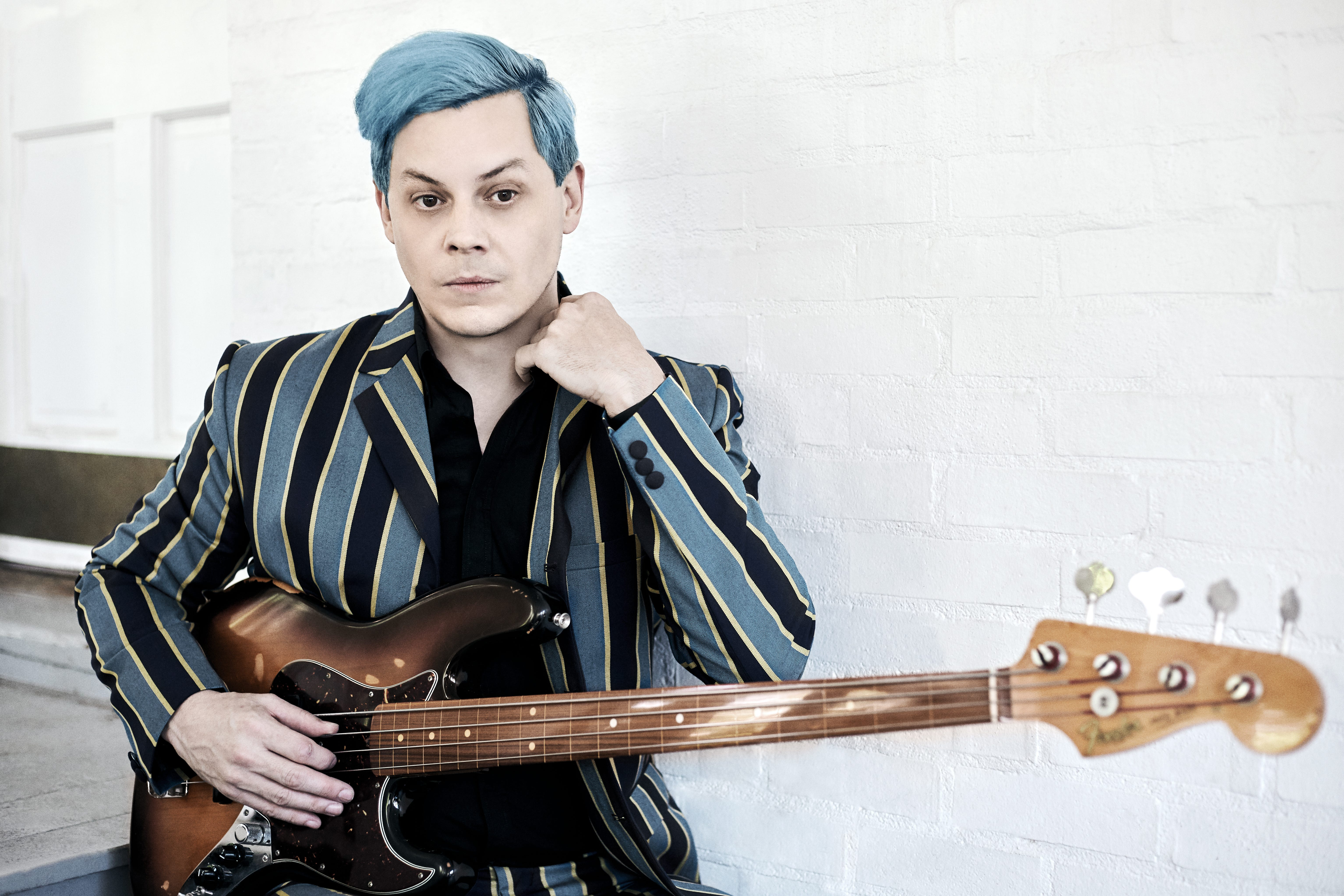
Singer Jack White wearing striped Madcap England blazer, 2021.

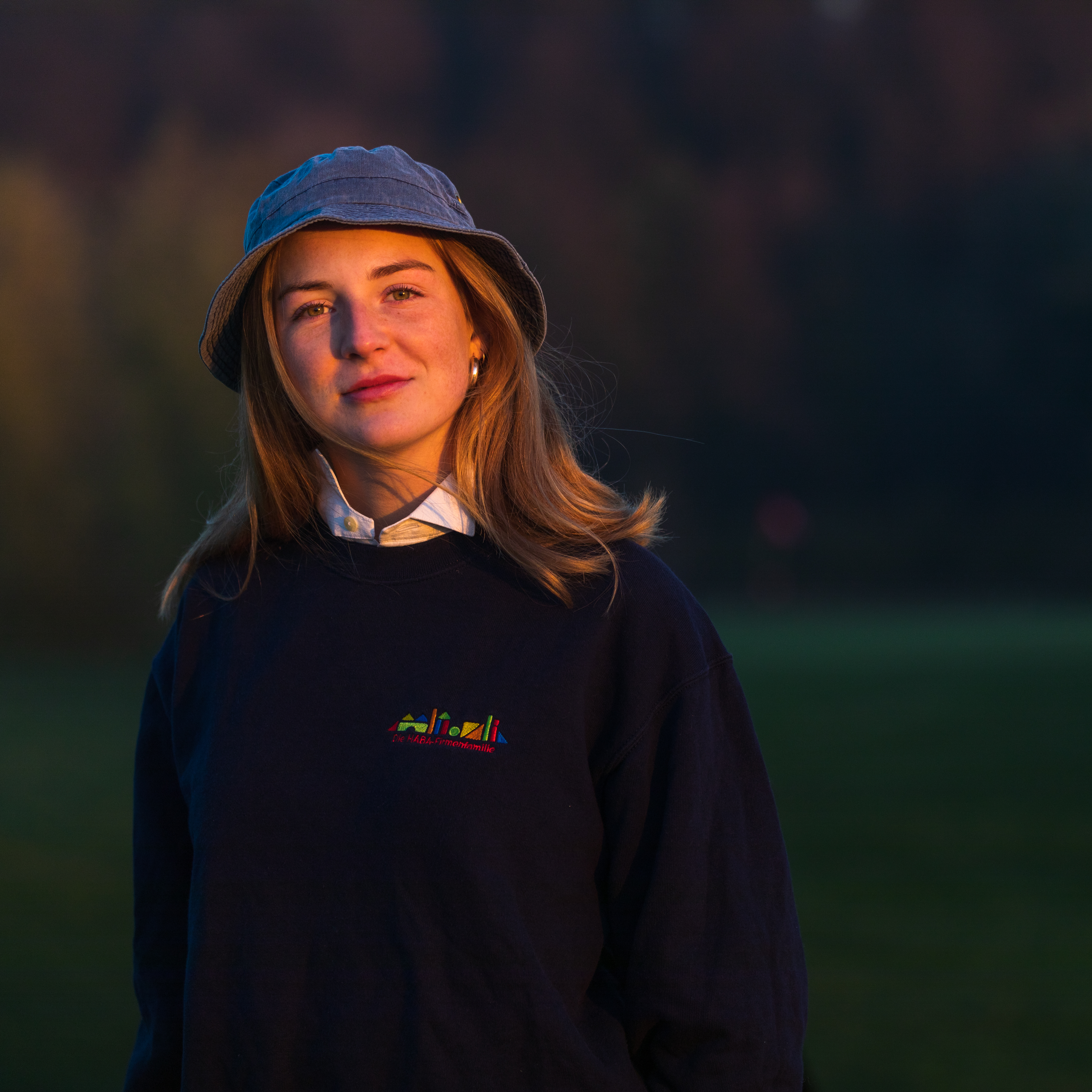
Teen girl wearing early 2020s fashion trends.

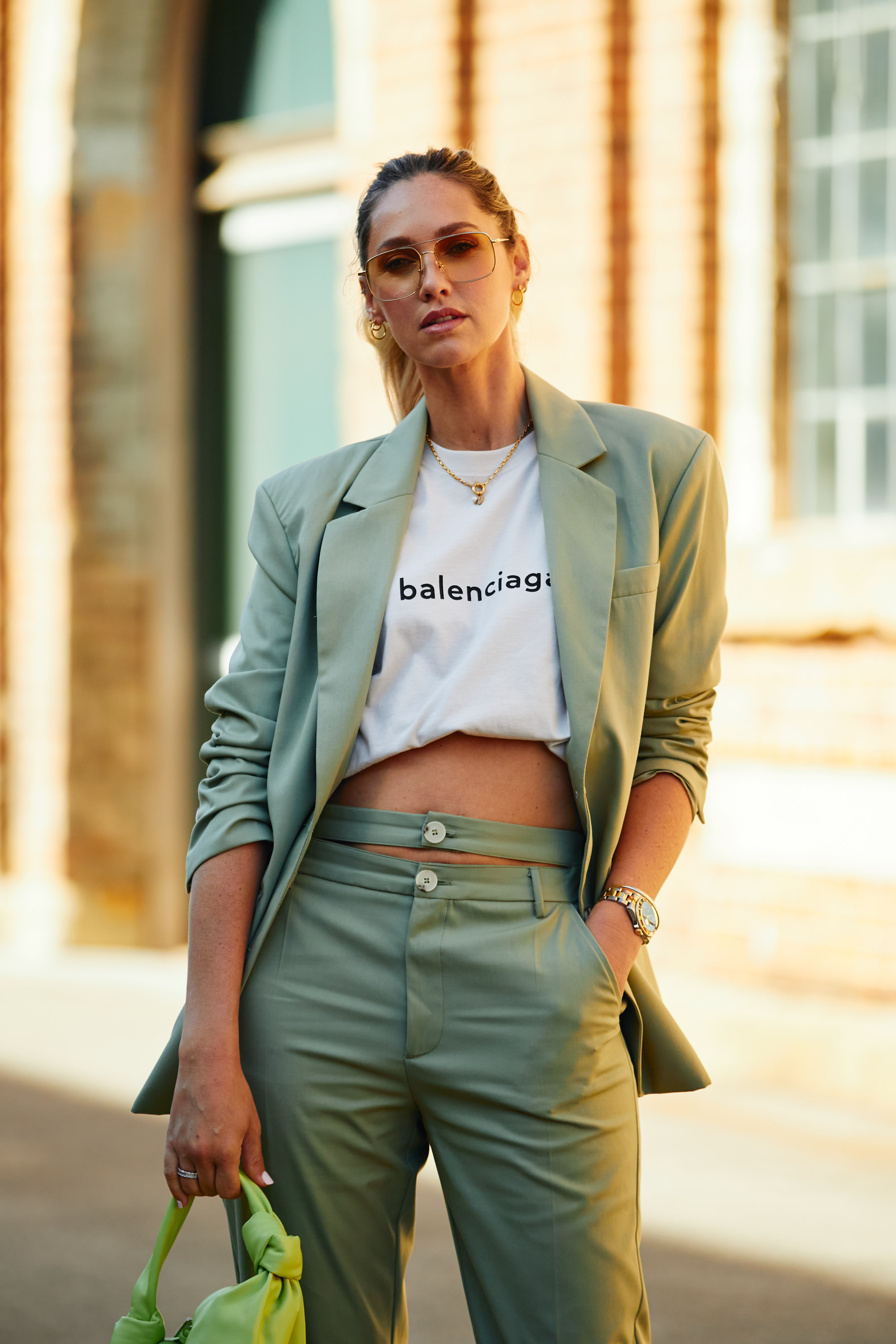
2021: Nikki Phillips in Fashion Week.

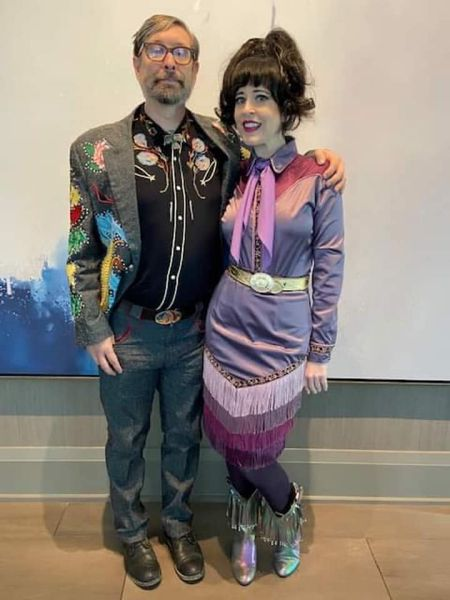
Brightly colored western clothing, early to mid 2020s

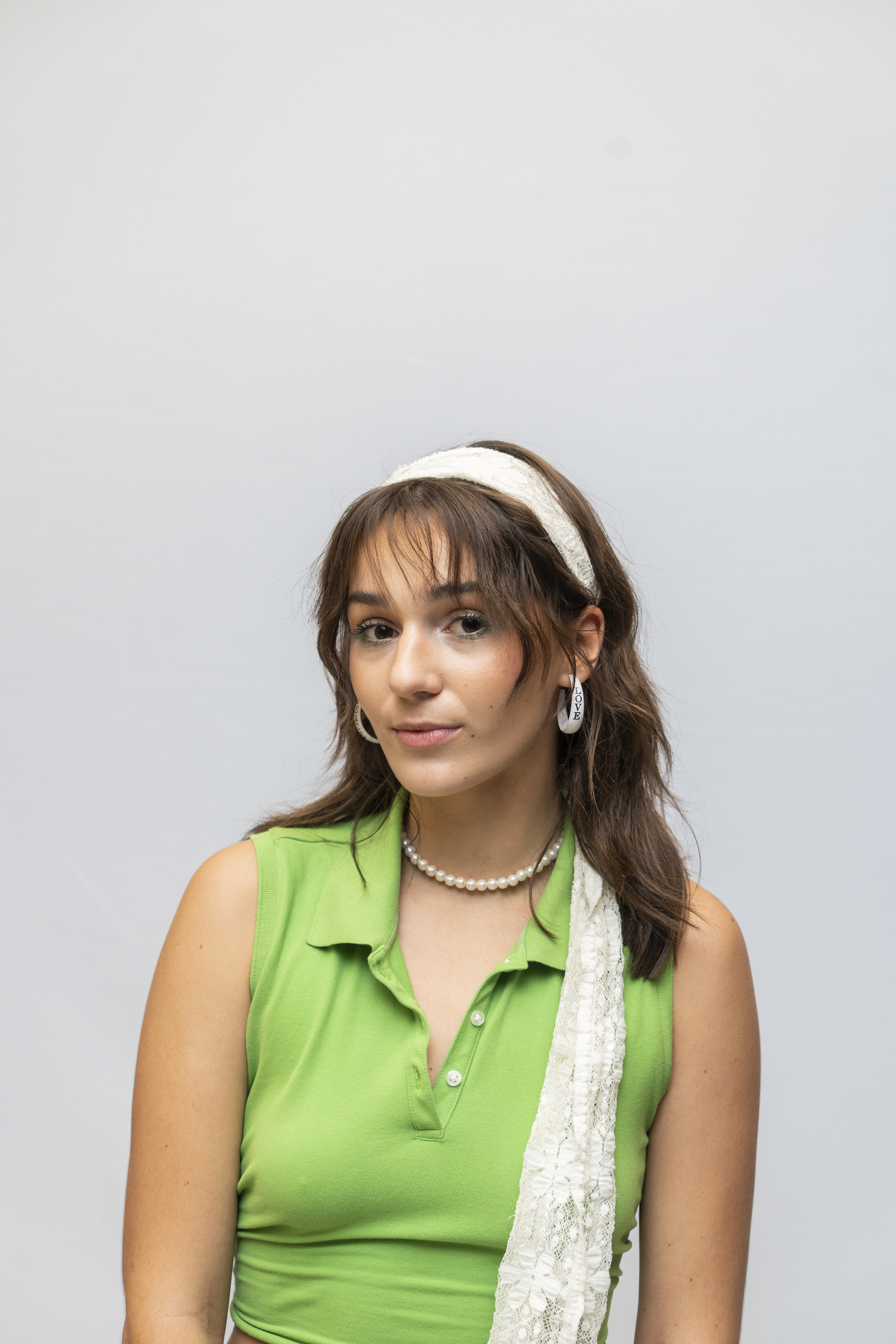
Student in 2022.

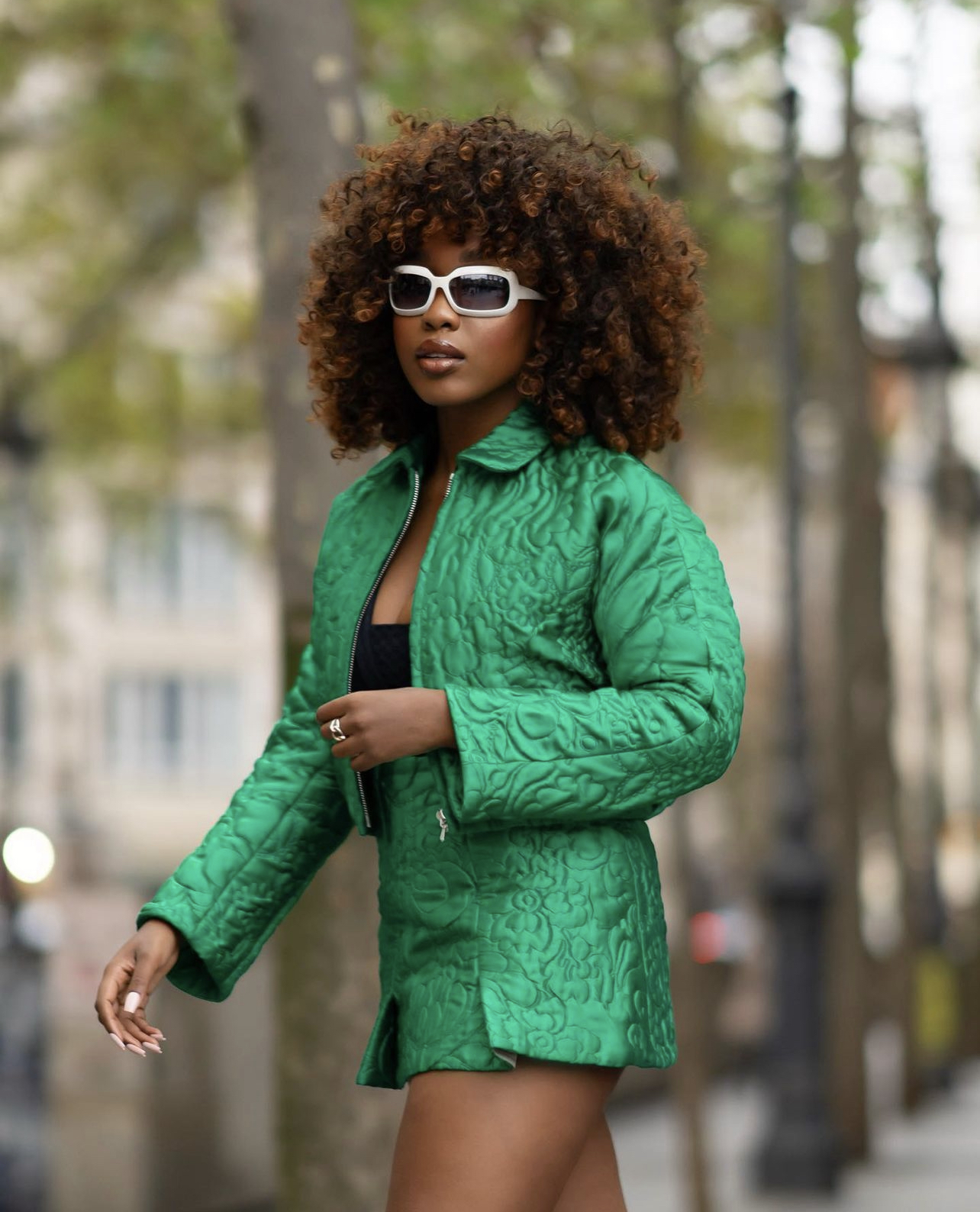
French woman attending 2022 Fashion Week.

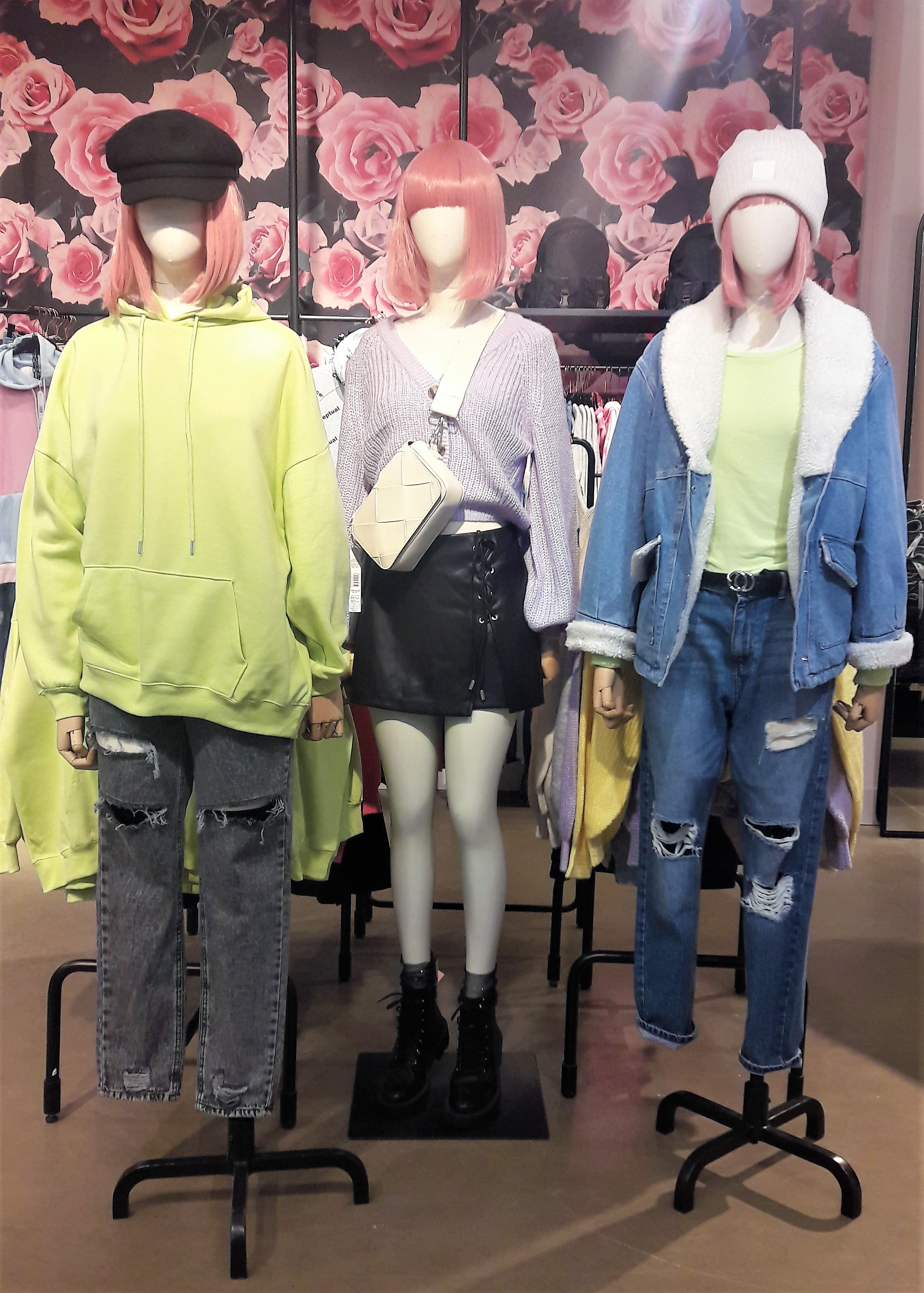
Clothes for sale in 2021.

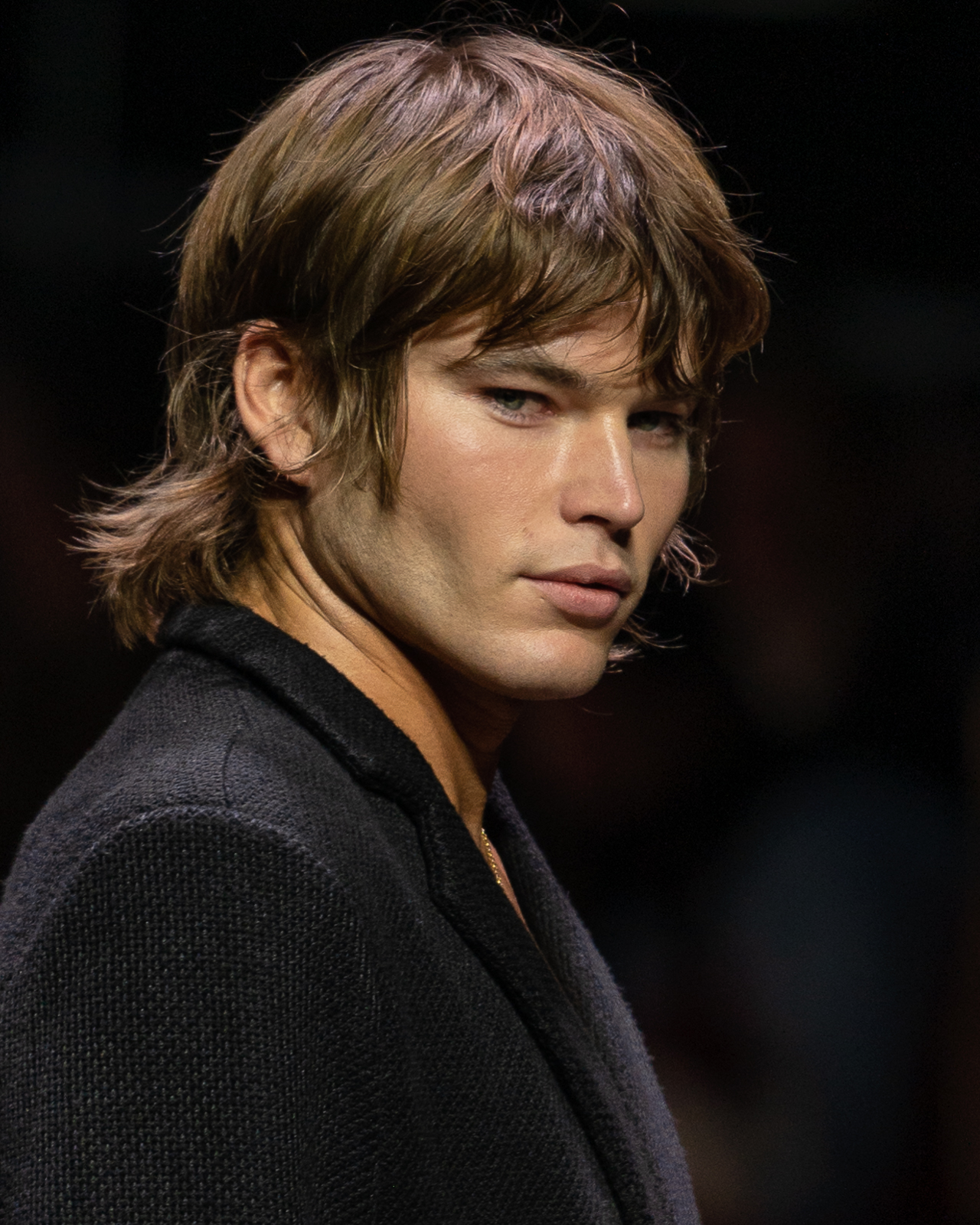
The mullet/shaggy hairstyle became a popular hairstyle among men.

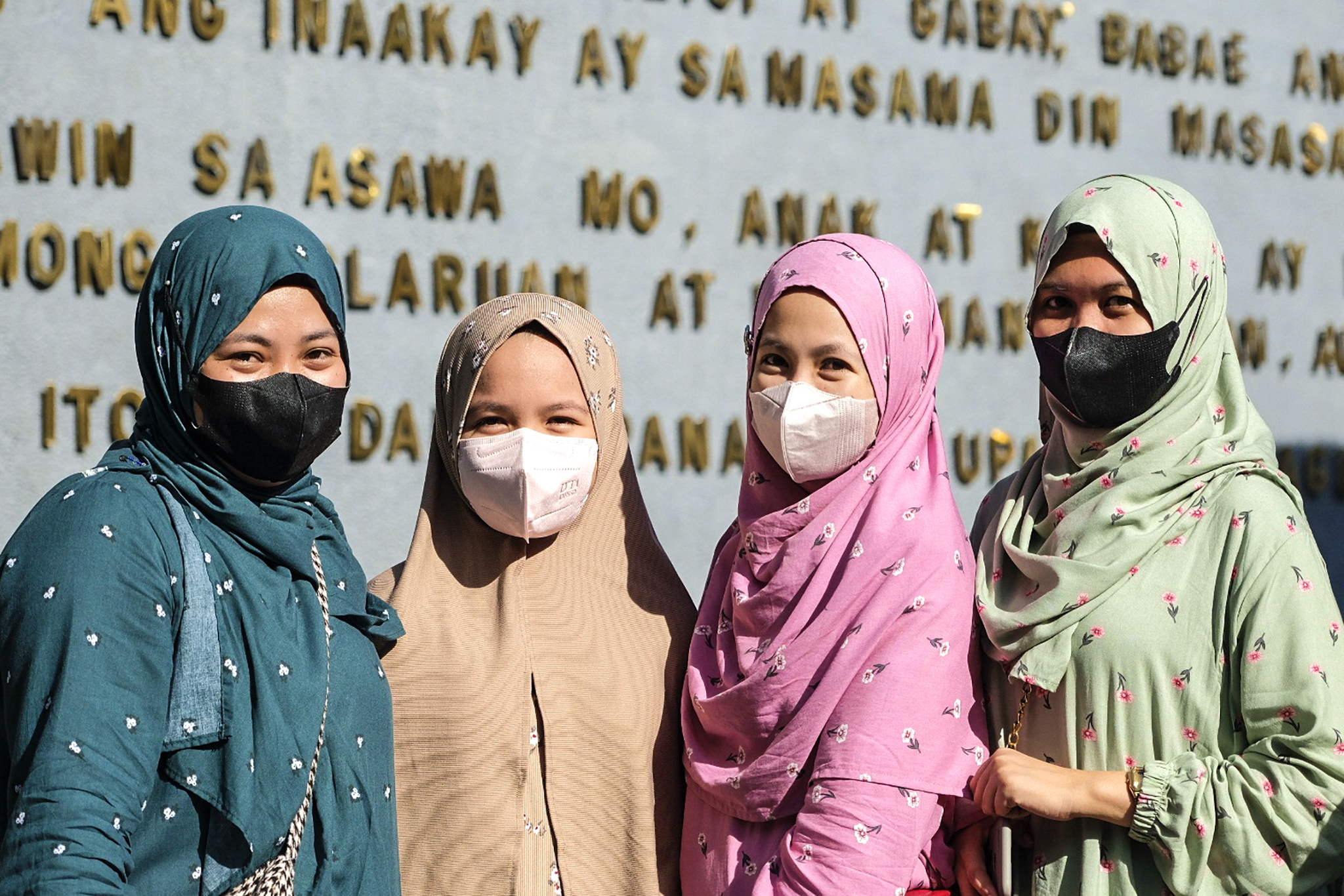
Indonesian girls wearing face masks in 2022.

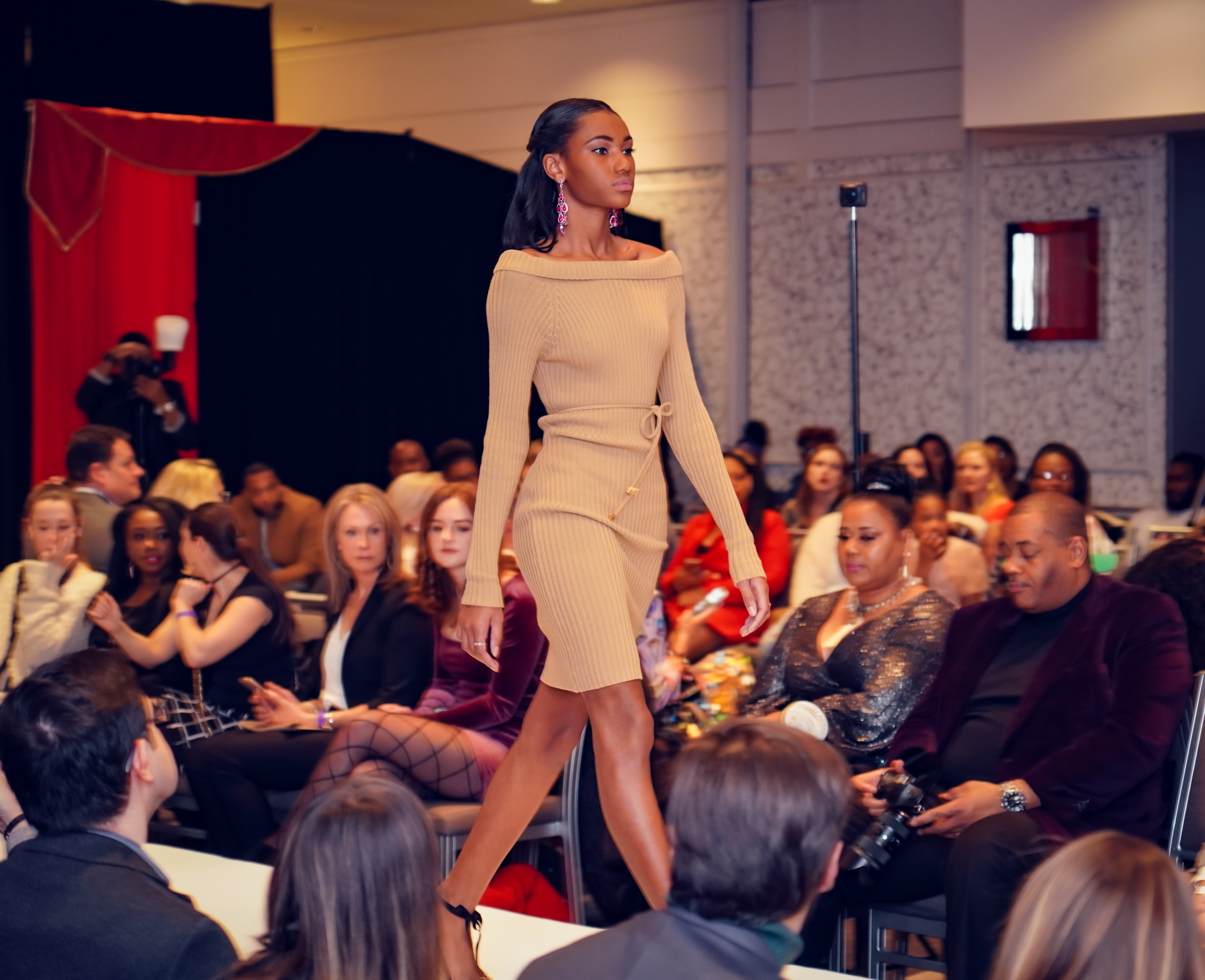
2020: Blush pink dress designed by Shey Natividad for DC Fashion Week.

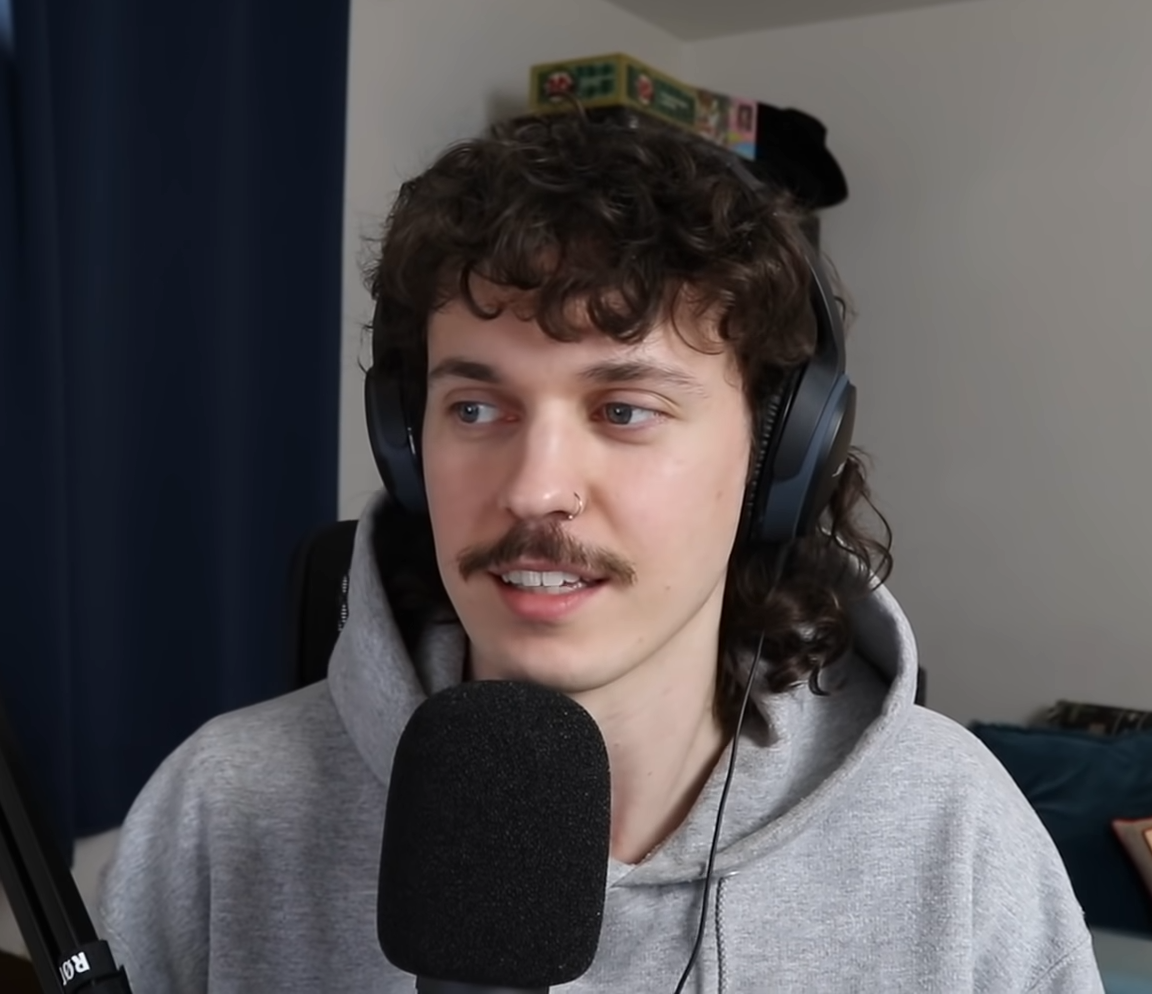
Stand-up comedian Kurtis Conner wearing early 2020s mullet hairstyle and mustache.

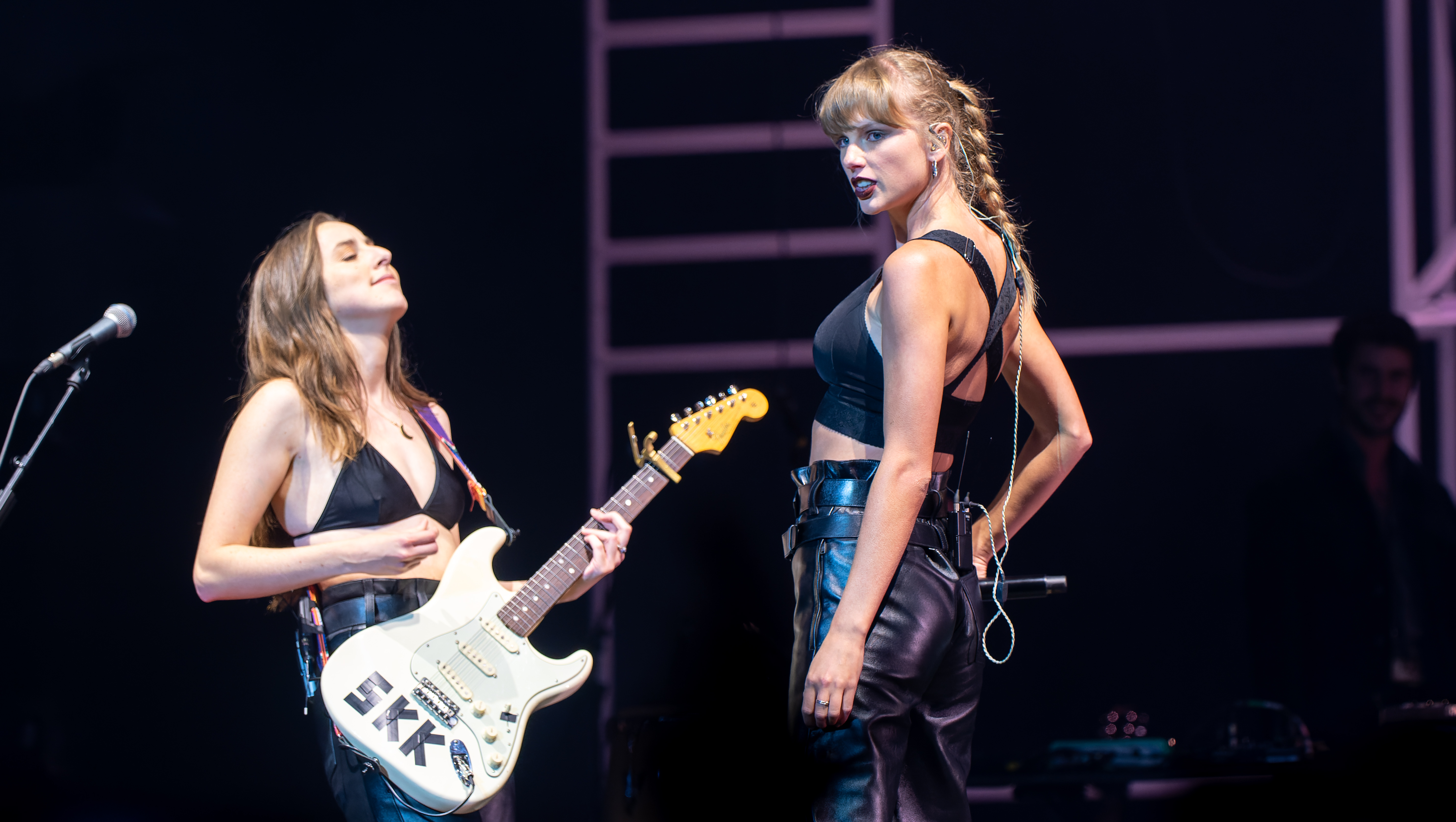
Haim and Taylor Swift in industrial-inspired all-black outfits in a 2022 concert.

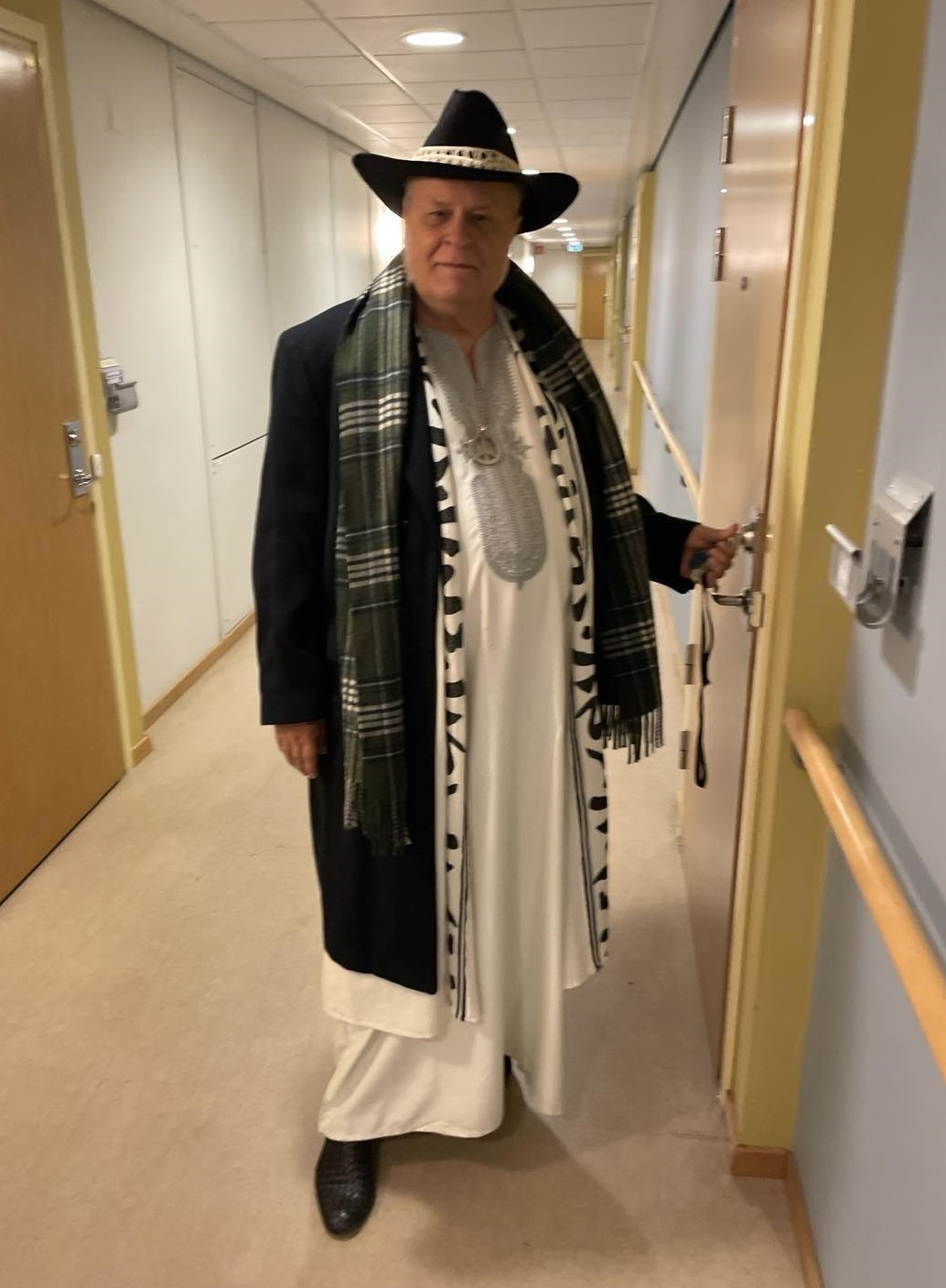
Elderly man dressed up in Stockholm in 2023

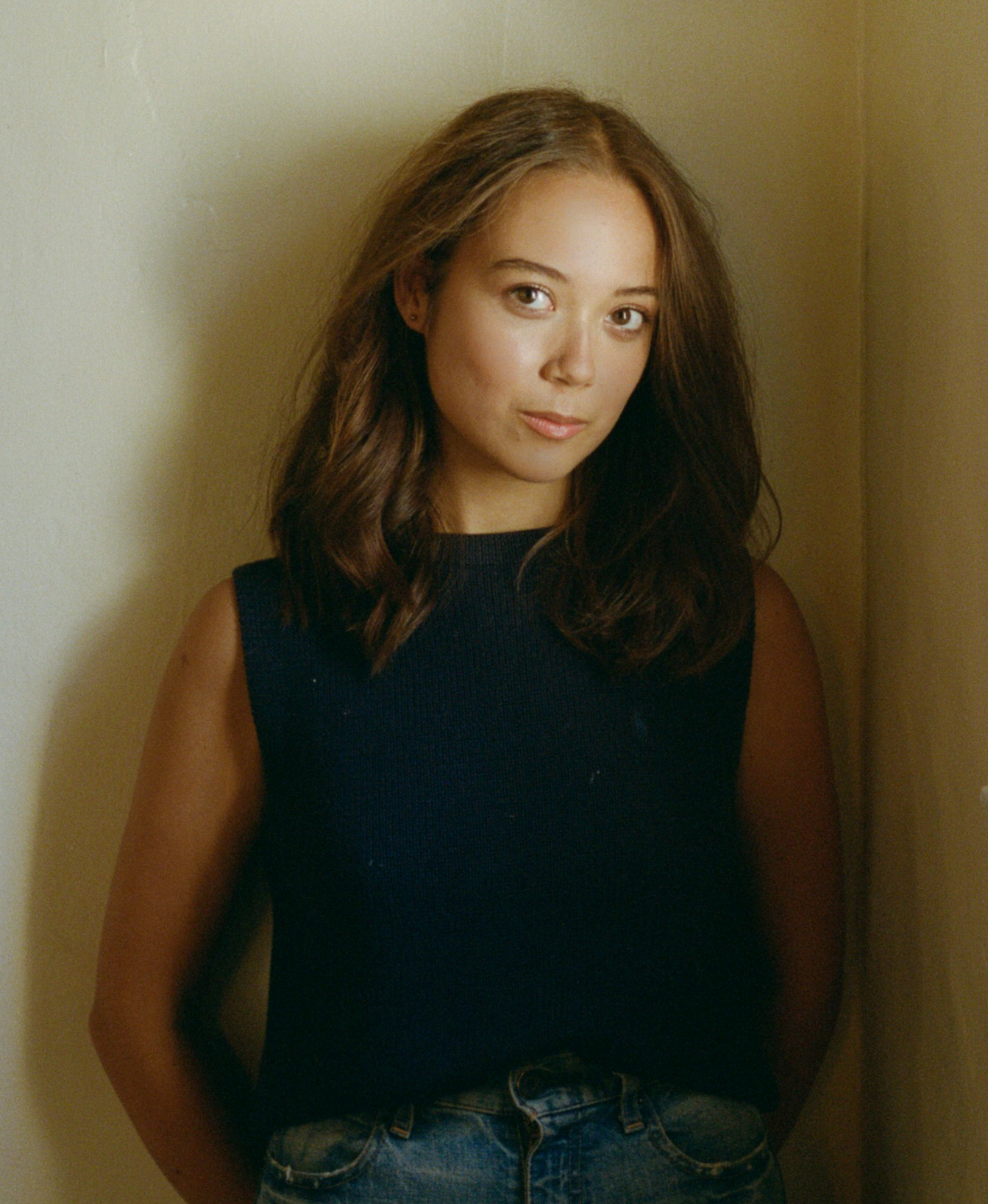
Icelandic pop artist Laufey dressed in a high-collared tank top and jeans

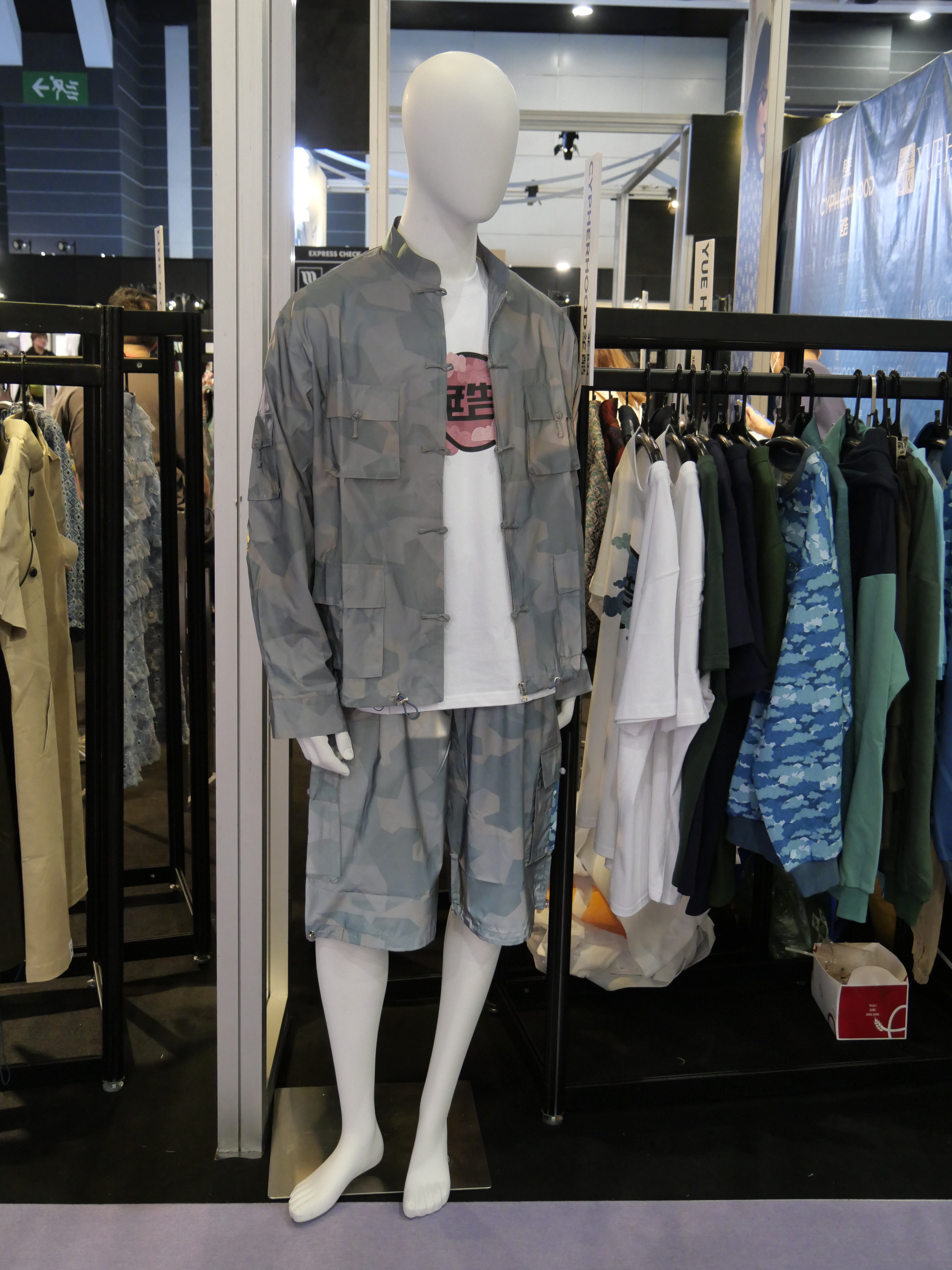
Contemporary Chinese Mao jacket, 2023.

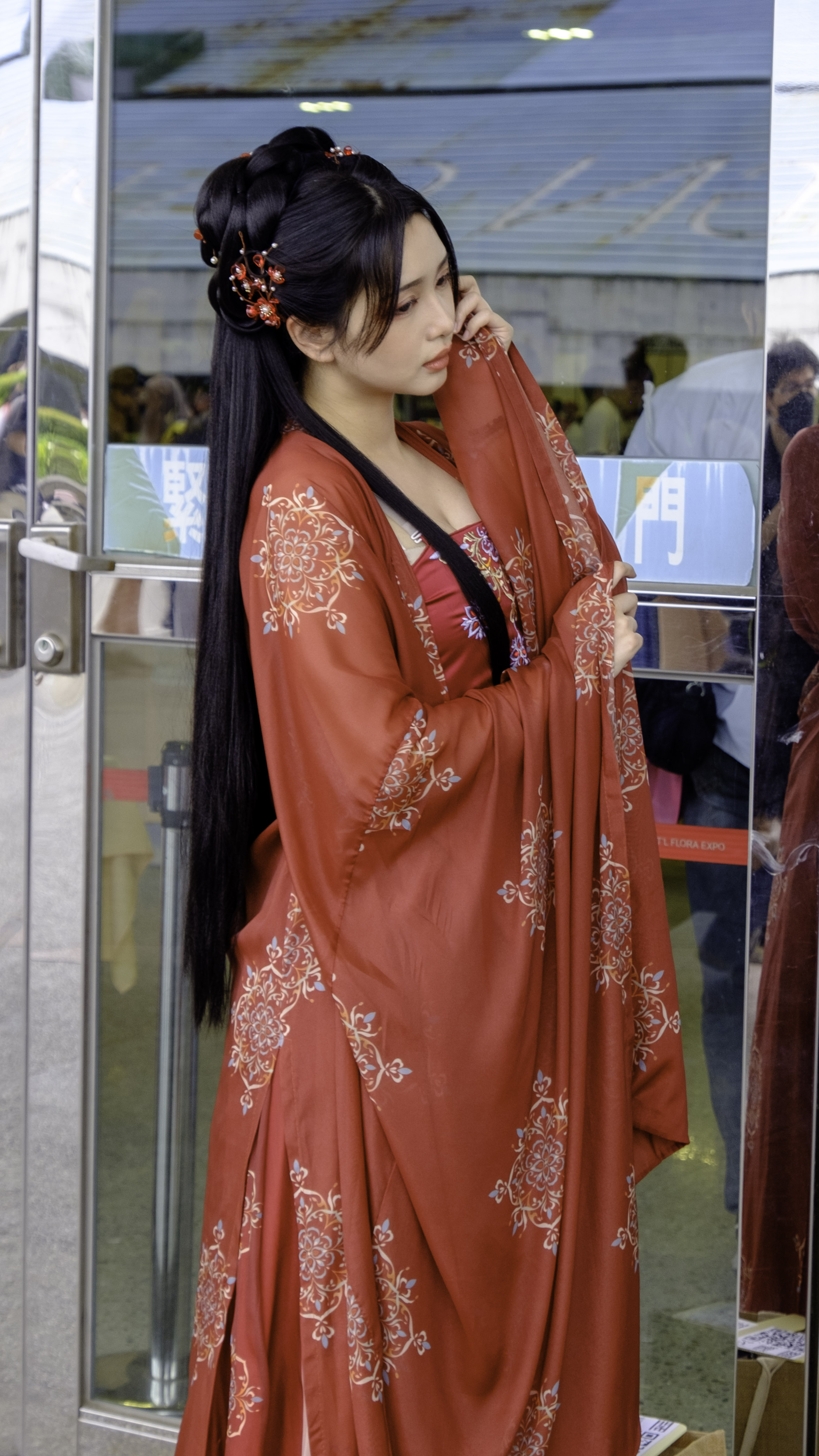
Taiwanese teen girl in Hanfu, 2024.

== See also ==
- 2020s
- 2000s in fashion
- 2010s in fashion
- Impact of the COVID-19 pandemic on the fashion industry
- History of Western fashion
- Fashion design
