= Wings (haircut) =

Hairstyle

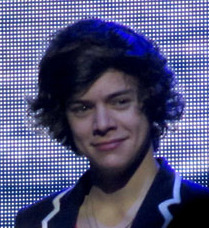
Wings hairstyle worn by pop star Harry Styles.

The wings haircut, also known the Mod haircut, Mop top, flippies, flow, Justin Bieber haircut, or skater hair is a popular hairstyle used in the skateboarding, surfer, mod, and preppy community. Typically long, the style can range from long and drooping below the eyes, to a shorter length. The haircut is typically wavy and, if straight, the length comes to halfway down the ears. Instead of lying on the wearer's ears, the hair flips up and comes straight out like an airplane wing, hence the name. The hairstyle was popular among men in the 1960s, 1970s, early 1980s, mid-late 2000s, early 2010s and 2020s.

== Origins ==
This hairstyle was first worn by Victorian gentlemen from the 1830s until the 1890s, usually with a beard or muttonchop sideburns. During the mid to late 19th century an oiled and curled version of this haircut was popular among young costermongers, volunteer firefighters and New York gang members like the Bowery B'hoys.

From the end of World War I until the pompadour became popular in the 1950s, younger men cut their hair very short for an athletic look, although the longer hair continued to be worn by some older men born before 1890, such as Western actor George "Gabby" Hayes.

During the 1920s, the wings haircut was worn as an alternative to the bob cut and pageboy hairstyle by flappers and young children. It remained popular during the war years for its practicality when women worked in the factories. After the war, women's hair grew increasingly longer until the 1960s, when it made a comeback among younger women like Twiggy, and continued to be worn into the 1970s.

== Popularity among youth subcultures ==
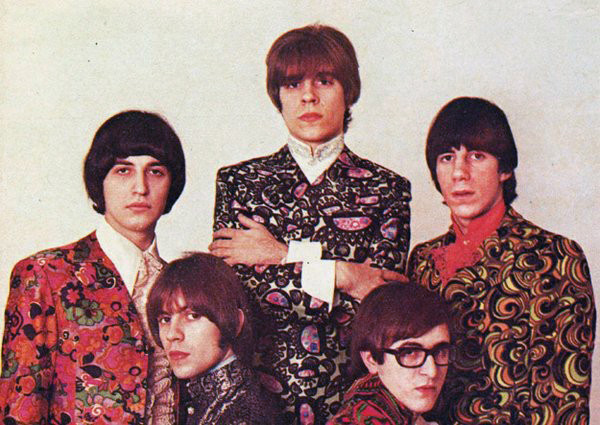
Typical Mod hairstyles of the mid to late 1960s

In the early 1960s, the wings haircut made a comeback among the Beatnik and surfer subcultures who allowed their hair to grow out bushy and unstyled. Rock bands like the Rolling Stones and the Beatles copied this look, which spread to America during the British Invasion and was adopted by bands like the Monkees and the Byrds.

By the mid-1960s, the wings haircut was worn by the mod subculture to set them apart from the older generation and from the Rockers who favored Brylcreemed hair like the pompadour. In the late 1960s, hippies grew their hair shoulder-length in protest against the Vietnam War. Wings or flows were often seen sported by North American ice hockey players, especially during the 1970s, 1990s, 2000s, and 2010s.

Throughout the 1970s and early-1980s, the wings hairstyle was common among teenagers and young men, while those with curly hair wore afros, until it was supplanted by the quiff in the mid-1980s. By the 1990s, however, hair was buzzed short, remaining so for teenagers until the mid-2000s when the wings haircut, together with 1960s inspired vintage clothing, made a comeback among fans of indie pop. Scene kids imitated the look, dyeing their hair with bright-colored streaks and growing the back longer. Emos incorporated a fringe or bangs and dyed their hair black while preppies copied the neater, more styled version worn by pop singers such as Justin Bieber or Harry Styles from One Direction.

== Gallery ==
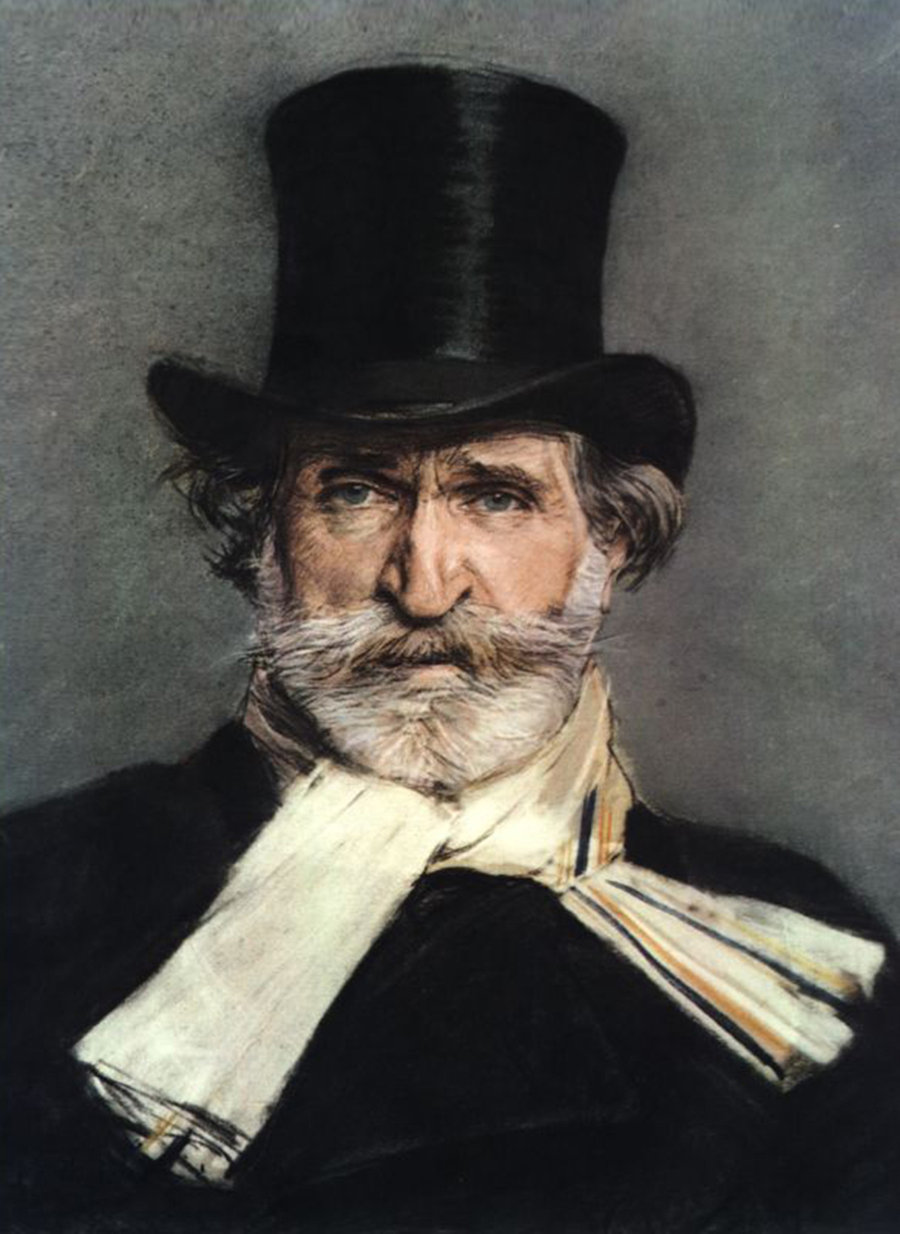
Mid-length wings haircut worn by Classical composer Giuseppe Verdi, 1886

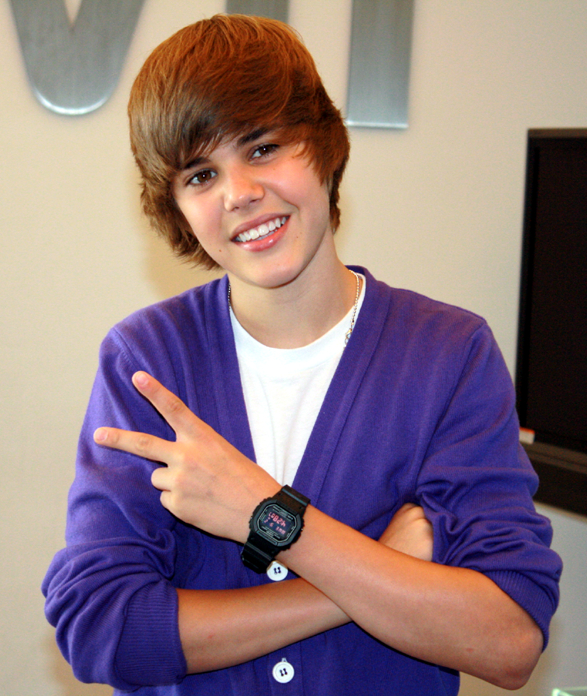
Justin Bieber's eponymous hairstyle in 2009

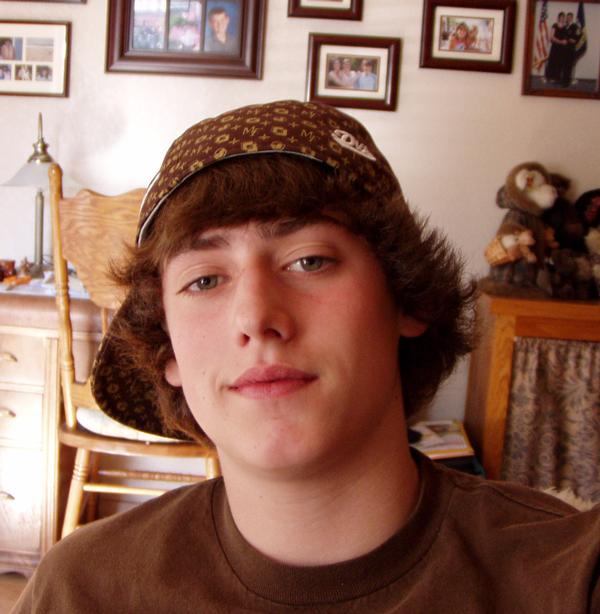
Wings hairstyle (2006)

== See also ==
- List of hairstyles
- Shag
- Surfer hair
- 1970s in fashion
- 2000s in fashion
- 2010s in fashion
