= Broccoli haircut =

Hairstyle

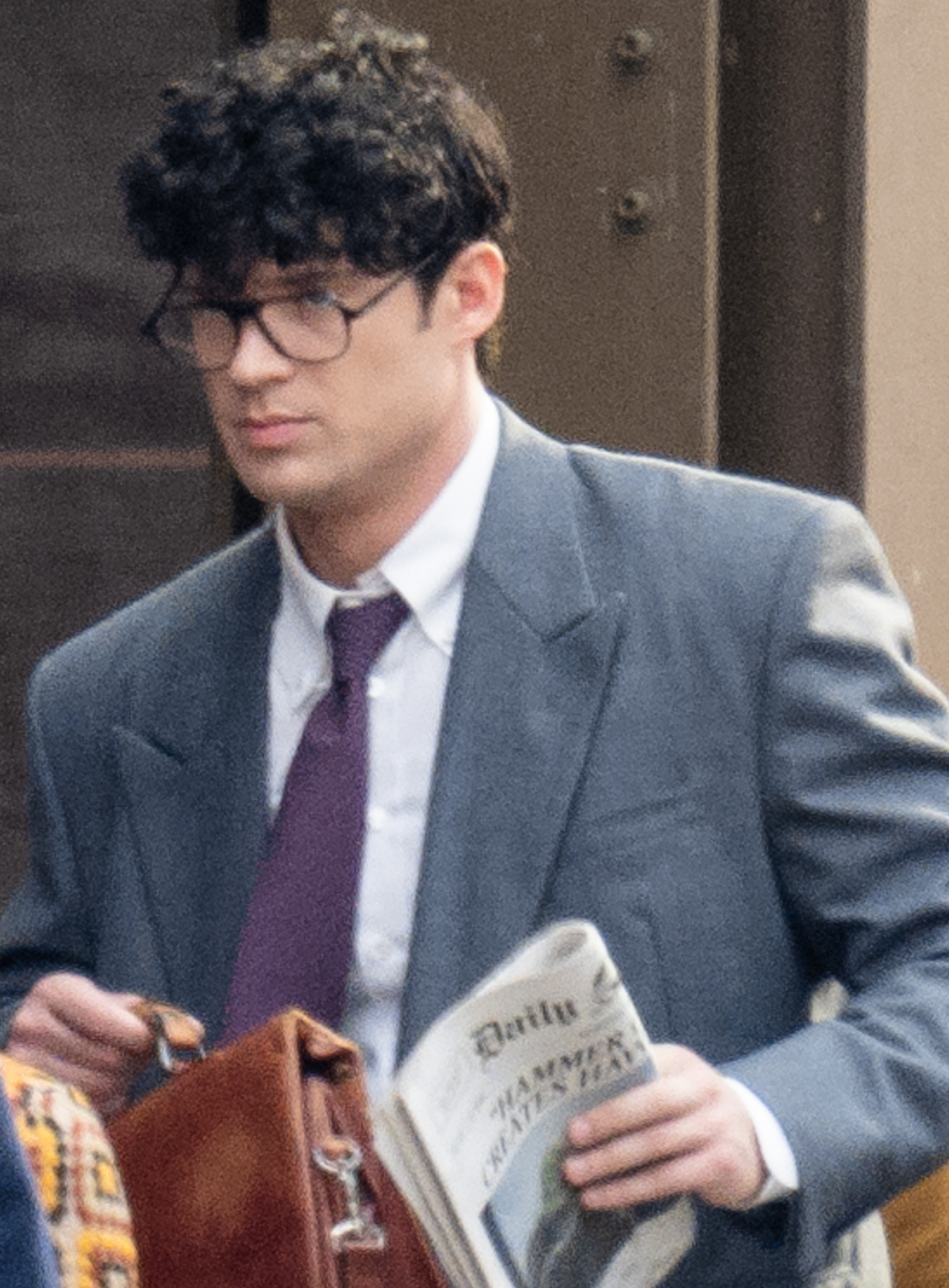
The broccoli haircut features short sides and a curly top. A 2024 photo of actor David Corenswet on the set of the 2025 film Superman went viral due to him sporting the haircut.

A broccoli haircut (also known as a Zoomer perm, bird's nest, in the UK as the meet me at McDonald's haircut or alpaca back and sides) is a type of haircut with tapered sides and layered curls on top, sometimes achieved with a perm. It became popular among teenage and tween boys during the latter part of the 2010s and into the 2020s, particularly due to its spread on TikTok, and became an Internet meme around the same time.

== Definition ==
The broccoli haircut is a hairstyle with tapered sides and short, uneven layered curls on top, which are often permed. It is referred to as such due to its resemblance to a floret of broccoli. It has also been referred to as the "Zoomer perm" for its popularity among members of Generation Z, as well as "bird's nest hair", "bussin haircut" or "alpaca hair". It has been described as a variation on a bowl cut.

== History ==
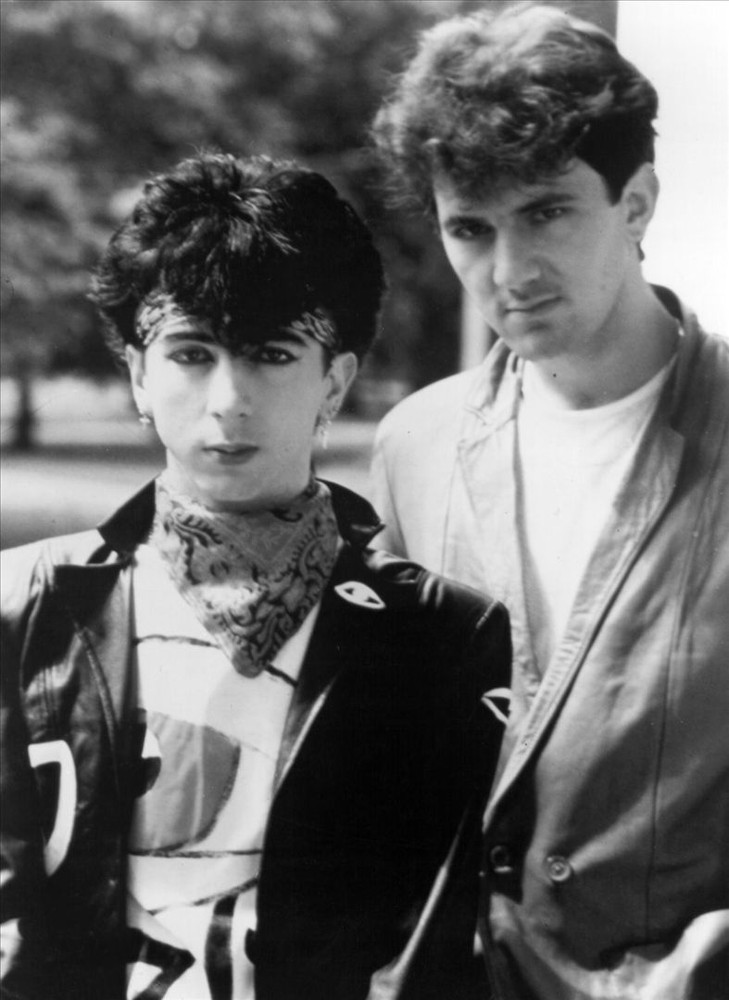
Permed haircuts worn by Soft Cell in 1983

The precursor to the modern broccoli haircut first appeared in the early 1980s among fans of new wave groups such as Soft Cell, Talking Heads, A Flock of Seagulls, Duran Duran, The Jesus and Mary Chain, and Wham! It was a grown-out, unstyled version of the quiff popular in the early 1980s that was frequently permed or made to look big with hair spray.

During the early and mid 2010s, the permed undercuts of the 1980s and 1990s underwent a revival. The trend was inspired by hairstyles popular during the New Romantic movement of the 1980s, such as mullets and shags. By 2018, possibly having been popularized by rapper Little T (Joshua Tate), the hairstyle had gained recognition in the UK as the "Meet me at McDonald's haircut". The hairstyle achieved media exposure after a school in Great Yarmouth, Norfolk banned pupils from possessing the style.

During the COVID-19 lockdowns of the early 2020s, many younger Gen Z boys in the UK and United States experimented with new hairstyles at home before the barbers reopened. In 2020, Dillon Latham, a then-15-year-old TikToker, posted a clip of himself getting a perm in the style of the broccoli haircut, which prompted its early spread among teenage and tween boys. It soon became more a trend in 2021 after being worn by TikTokers such as Noah Beck, Bryce Hall, Harry Jowsey, and Jack Doherty. That same year, it became an Internet meme and a subject of scorn online, beginning with a 4chan thread that coined the phrase "Zoomer perm" to describe it.

The broccoli haircut was especially popular by 2022 and gained further attention online in 2024 when a photo of American actor David Corenswet on the set of James Gunn's 2025 film Superman showed him with what many online described as a broccoli haircut, which was mocked by social media users. GQ's Alex Nino Gheciu argued that the broccoli haircut had reached its peak by 2024. Also in 2024, Marie Claire's Samantha Holender called the haircut "the TikTok tween boy hallmark".

== Social reception and health concerns ==
=== Natural hair movement and self-expression ===
The style's prominence has sparked debate among cultural commentators regarding teenage body image and authenticity. Supporters argue that its widespread adoption has normalized naturally curly and wavy textures, allowing adolescent boys to embrace hair patterns previously sidelined by straight-hair standards. Conversely, critics note that the style frequently relies on artificial perming rather than natural texture, suggesting the trend capitalizes on adolescent insecurities by reframing chemically altered hair as an organic aesthetic.

=== Chemical perms and hair health ===
Because the hairstyle relies heavily on top volume, many straight-haired teenagers turn to chemical perms to recreate the look. Hairdressers and dermatologists point out that repeated perming weakens the hair shaft by breaking its natural disulfide bonds, which often leads to dry cuticle damage, hair splitting, and scalp inflammation if treatments are applied too frequently or without proper care.

== See also ==
- List of hairstyles
