= The Rachel =

Hairstyle named after Friends character Rachel Green

Jennifer Aniston portraying her character, Rachel Green, while donning the eponymous hairstyle

The Rachel haircut, commonly known as simply "The Rachel", is an eponymous hairstyle popularized by American actress Jennifer Aniston. Named after Rachel Green, the character she played on the American sitcom Friends (1994–2004), Aniston debuted the haircut during the show's first season, and continued to wear it throughout its second season while the series was nearing peak popularity. Designed by Aniston's hairstylist Chris McMillan to repair her damaged hair and grow out her bangs, "The Rachel" is a voluminous shoulder-length haircut, with several distinct layers that frame and turn outwards from its wearer's face. It has been described as a variation on both the shag and bob haircuts.

Aniston first wore the hairstyle in the first-season episode "The One With the Evil Orthodontist", shortly after which it became a global trend and one of the most requested styles at hair salons throughout the decade. Although the style experienced peak ubiquity during the 1990s, it has experienced several revivals in the years since the show aired, notably following the advent of social media and airing of the television special Friends: The Reunion in 2021. The hairstyle itself has received mixed reviews from journalists, with some arguing that it flattered few apart from Aniston and several criticizing its difficulty to maintain.

"The Rachel" is widely considered to be one of the most famous hairstyles in history, having been constantly emulated by millions of women worldwide and remaining popular for over 20 years since its debut. Despite its popularity, Aniston has publicly stated that she dislikes the hairstyle due to its difficulty to maintain and replicate without McMillan's assistance.

== History ==
=== Background and design ===
"The Rachel" was created by hairstylist Chris McMillan, and colored by Michael Canalé. (Note: Colorist Michael Canalé has sometimes been identified as a co-creator. He told StarCentral Magazine, "Together [with Chris McMillan], we created the 'Rachel' for Jennifer Aniston – it was his cut and my color. Both that cut and her color, have withstood the test of time.") Recommended to Aniston by her Friends co-star Courteney Cox, Aniston's manager first recruited McMillan to style the actress' hair for the Friends pilot. Aniston's manager was also managing actress Patricia Arquette, whose hair McMillan had been styling around the same time. Insisting that her client get her hair done urgently because she found it to be in poor condition and "a terrible length", the manager suggested that Aniston visit McMillan's salon for the first time. McMillan was determined to convince Aniston, whose hair was very long and frizzy at the time, to attempt a different hairstyle that included a shorter length and highlights. McMillan drew inspiration from several sources, including male surfers from his Manhattan Beach hometown, model Beri Smither's bob cut, and model Amber Valletta's blowouts styled by hairstylist Garren. McMillan insists that he did not intentionally create the hairstyle for Aniston, admitting that he had also given a similar haircut to actress Cameron Diaz. According to McMillan, the hairstyle was created to grow out Aniston's bangs, which he achieved by bringing "up the length to make the bangs seem longer" before pulling "the hair over so she didn't look like she had bangs", from which "the layers started falling forward". Having known Aniston prior to the pilot, Canalé had already been coloring her hair before the haircut itself occurred, adding "highlights from roots to ends" to "create the perfect canvas for" McMillan's cut. Canalé lightened Aniston's naturally medium-brown hair into a caramelized brown while using blonde highlights on the tips, which the colorist believes gave her hair the impression that it had been gradually faded by the Sun over time. After the cut, he incorporated additional "paper-thin highlights" for which the look has become known. Canalé has since continued to color Aniston's hair. At this time, McMillan was struggling with a drug addiction, and admitted to having been under the influence when he cut Aniston's hair into "The Rachel". Aniston and McMillan have since maintained a strong friendship, and she credits "The Rachel" with forcing her to pay attention to her own hair going forward.

"The Rachel" is described as an intricate, voluminous, feathered haircut that ends just shy of its wearer's collarbone, with "choppy layers, chunky blonde highlights, and a blown-out look". Comedian Dewayne Perkins identified layers, highlights and a "weird bang opening" as the hairstyle's defining characteristics. Accentuated with a side-parted fringe, the hairstyle has alternately been referred to as a shag or bob cut, In addition to framing the face, the haircut is styled to "flick outwards" to increase movement. Describing its original color as "caramelized blonde with natural roots that blended out to her ends", Canalé said the cut is distinguishable by its "signature colour pop around the front, and a little colour exaggerated in the tips". Before "The Rachel", Aniston typically wore her hair on Friends in a longer, wavier style. Aniston debuted the hairstyle in the first-season Friends episode "The One With the Evil Orthodontist", which premiered in 1995. Eventually becoming her character's signature hairdo, she continued to wear it throughout the show's first and second seasons. Although the style remained at the beginning of season three, the haircut began to grow into a longer, "more full-bodied" version of itself by 1996, with Aniston having decided to grow it out after only eight months. The actress abandoned "The Rachel" altogether by season four, replacing it with a longer layered look that she preferred.

Aniston has publicly stated on several occasions that she is not fond of "The Rachel", going as far as to say she would rather shave her head than wear it again, and calling it "the ugliest haircut I've ever seen". Her feelings towards it have fluctuated over time, eventually explaining she was frustrated that "It was all anyone ever wanted to know about, all Chris ever got asked to do". Aniston liked the haircut when it was first styled, identifying it as the first time her hair received compliments. However, she found it very difficult to maintain and replicate without McMillan's involvement, likening the unsuccessful results of styling it herself to a "frizzy mop". Despite being bemused by its popularity, Aniston has since described herself as having a love-hate relationship with the hairstyle, finding herself able to appreciate the history of its simplicity. Although he considers "The Rachel" to be "an easy cut" to provide, McMillan agreed that the style is high-maintenance, requiring regular trims, a blow dryer and a round brush to "define all those flicks", as well as three brushes and at times Velcro rollers. Aniston likened the process of styling the look to performing surgery.

=== Initial reaction and popularity ===
Shortly after "The One With the Evil Orthodontist" premiered in April 1995, Aniston's haircut became an international phenomenon during the mid-1990s, inciting a global trend by becoming one of the time's most sought-after hairstyles among fans and celebrities alike. E! Online's Alyssa Ray wrote that the haircut became popular to the point where it practically morphed into its own Friends character. McMillan recalled that several magazines and publications nicknamed it "The Rachel" soon after the haircut debuted, and began inviting him for interviews. Some fans of the show flew themselves to McMillan's salon in Los Angeles so he could give them the haircut personally, a service for which he only charged $60 at the time. In 1995, photographer Robert Trachtenberg photographed Aniston for an issue of Entertainment Weekly, at the time describing the look as having "a gigantic presence in pop culture". Conceived by Trachtenberg, the Entertainment Weekly image depicted Aniston's head surrounded by multiple wig heads as shown through the window of a wig store. The photo required Aniston to place her head in a wooden hole. Although she was physically uncomfortable during the photoshoot, she supported the idea of poking fun at the hairstyle, with Trachtenberg describing her as "a real trooper about it".

The cut remained one of the most requested hairstyles throughout the decade, with Becky Hughes of Parade reporting that it was the most-requested haircut of the 1990s. Reaching peak popularity around its third year, it inspired millions of women to receive similar haircuts during the 1990s, in turn helping to establish Aniston as the show's breakout star. By the show's second and third seasons, newspapers and magazines reported that salons from Los Angeles to New York were being overwhelmed with female customers requesting Aniston's haircut. Some customers brought their own copies of magazines such as TV Guide for reference, while others recorded and played episodes of the series at the salon to ensure accuracy. In 1996, Alabama-based hair stylist Lisa Pressley reported she was styling approximately four "Rachels" per week to women between the ages of 13 and 30, not including touch-ups and re-stylings. Another hairstylist estimated that "The Rachel" accounted for at least 40% of her business among female clients during this time.

Some television shows attempted to achieve the hairstyle's success on their own programs. Inspired by its popularity, producers suggested that Will & Grace star Debra Messing attempt to replicate the hairstyle on her own sitcom. Although McMillan himself styled the first cut, Messing recanted once they realized maintaining it without McMillan was impractical, with the show spending several hours trying to straighten her hair with little success. Singer Mariah Carey also attempted to do the hairstyle during the mid-1990s, which Carey retrospectively called a "sad attempt" but Aniston defended.

Friends hair stylist Richard Marin would sometimes receive fan mail lambasting him for changing Rachel's hair. Cox jokingly expressed that she envied the fact that her hairstyles did not experience the same widespread popularity as "The Rachel", which she found perplexing due to the fact that they shared the same hairdresser. McMillan said that, in retrospect, he regrets not taking advantage of the haircut's popularity by establishing a business deal or launching a "Rachel" product line, but maintains that his profession is more focused on establishing close relationships with clients than being a businessman. Although Aniston eventually grew out the haircut and adopted a more conventional hairstyle, "The Rachel" remained a popular choice among women into the early 2000s.

=== Resurgence ===
Remaining popular beyond the 1990s, MSN reported that women were still requesting the Rachel haircut fifteen years after it debuted. The hairstyle experienced a resurgence at the beginning of the 2020s. Refinery29 reported that it reemerged "at the forefront of fashion" during the fall and winter of 2020, 25 years after it debuted. Singer Selena Gomez wore a longer version of the haircut on The Kelly Clarkson Show, inspired by a combination of Aniston's layers and actress Goldie Hawn's curtain bangs. The cut was styled by Gomez's hairstylist Marissa Marino. Gomez and model Chrissy Teigen are credited with leading the hairstyle's resurgence during the early 2020s. Katie Stanovick of The Zoe Report described the hairstyle's resurgence as ultimate "proof [that] '90s looks are in a full-swing comeback".

Admitting that he continues to give clients "The Rachel" frequently as of 2021, McMillan contemporizes the style by decreasing its volume at the crown. In the wake of Friends: The Reunion in July 2021, "The Rachel" drastically resurged in popularity due to revived interest in several of the sitcom's fashion trends as a result of the television special. Beauty retailer Just My Look reported that demand for the haircut had surged by 179%, with salons noticing a dramatic increase in customers requesting a "modern version" of the cut. On the social media platform TikTok, the hashtag #RachelGreen had received upwards of 600 million views by June 2021, with similar hashtags causing the hairstyle to go viral on other platforms such as Instagram, where the hashtag #rachelgreen had been used over 1 million times by June 2021. Predicting that the resurgence will surely keep stylists busy, at the time Evoke.ie reported that "we're not sure we've ever seen numbers like these for any other trend". TikTok users attempted to achieve the look using curling irons and hair rollers, in turn suffering far less heat damaged than the original style. Model Bella Hadid were among the most notable to adopt trend, as well as actress Renée Zellweger. Dubbed the "Modern Rachel" by the media, the revived rendition was notably slightly longer, softer and allowed for more movement, while retaining "the face-framing flick from its predecessor".

== Reception and analysis ==
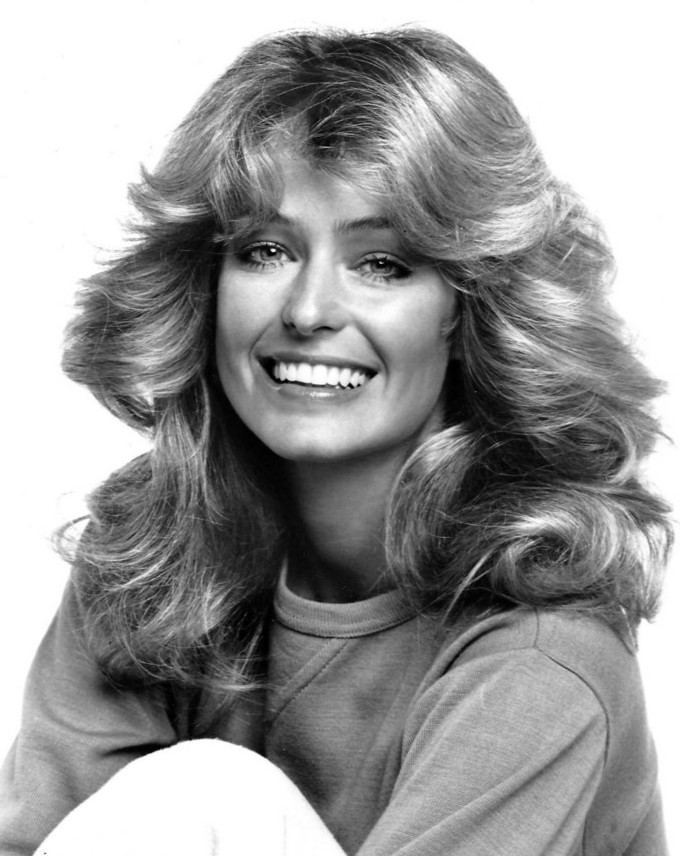
Due to its television origins, several journalists have likened "The Rachel"'s popularity to that of actress Farrah Fawcett's hairstyle.

Named after Aniston's Friends character Rachel Green, "The Rachel" is considered an eponymous hairstyle. Although several single-word and eponymous hairstyles had trended before, Emma Day of The National reported that "few could be captured in just one first name until" Friends introduced "The Rachel". Rachel Chang of Biography.com identified "The Rachel" as a successor to oft-imitated hairstyles worn by actresses Lucille Ball and Farrah Fawcett on their respective television series that aired during the 1950s and 1970s, while TV Guide highlighted both the "Farrah-do" and "The Rachel" as examples of television hairstyles that permeated audiences real life for decades. "The Rachel" was the first hairstyle since the 1970s to garner an enthusiastic reaction comparable to that of Fawcett's. Both hairstyles have been compared to each other, with Fawcett's experiencing its own social media revival in the 2020s shortly after "The Rachel". Saturday Night Live writer Sudi Green complained that "The Rachel" was derivative of hairstyles that preceded it, such as actress Meg Ryan's shag, explaining, "the Meg Ryan cut walked so that 'the Rachel' could soar".

Critical reception towards "The Rachel" has been generally mixed. Mental Floss writer Jason Serafino opined that the haircut "may have been a bit too Hollywood-looking for a twenty-something working for tips, but it fit in the world of Friends", while Metro's Katie Storey reviewed it as "the only haircut worth having in the '90s". Patricia Alfonso Tortolani of Allure, who had received "The Rachel" herself as a teenager, recalled that "nothing ... was more stylish" in 1997. However, Tortolani struggled to style and maintain the haircut, discovering that her own hair was too thick and susceptible to Miami humidity. Nevertheless, the writer credits her experience with "The Rachel" with teaching her to appreciate her natural hair. Traci Taylor of WHWK, who had donned the haircut for most of her youth, implored fans to "bring back The Rachel" in 2021, despite acknowledging that it "never totally went away". She found the haircut flattering and manageable. Joanna Robinson of Vanity Fair felt the hairstyle did not flatter every wearer, recalling that it "looked swanky on a select few and, unfortunately, mullet-y on the rest". Writing for Elle, Victoria Dawson Hoff reviewed "The Rachel" as "a bit too tousled, a bit too frosted, a bit too '90s, really", preferring Aniston's shorter, straighter bob from 2001. The Guardian fashion journalist Jess Cartner-Morley said that, despite convincing "an entire generation of women to have a layered mid-length shag cut ... not a single example of that haircut looking good on anyone except Rachel". Megan Reynolds of Jezebel lamented the return of "The Rachel" in 2020, describing it as "a bad haircut" despite its ubiquity. Like Aniston, several wearers discovered that the haircut was difficult to maintain without assistance from an experienced professional hairstylist despite its simple appearance, with Shorey Andrews of Slice remarking that "Unless you had your own private hairstylist ready to prep your cut each morning, there's a good chance you never fully achieved the style you were hoping for".

Both industry professionals and journalists have analyzed "The Rachel"'s popularity at great length. Although McMillan did not create the haircut with the intention of garnering attention, Serafino believes its impact was inevitable in hindsight, citing Friends' strong viewership and Aniston's status as the show's breakout star among factors that contributed to the cut's popularity. The hairstyle coincided with a period of time during which the sitcom was averaging 25 million viewers per episode, exposing itself to millions of viewers per week. McMillan agreed that the style "goes down in history as 'the Rachel' because people saw Jen on their TV every week and they were obsessed with her, and with Friends". Hairstylist Luke Hersheson believes "The Rachel" succeeded because audiences who had grown weary of grunge fashion that had previously dominated the decade gravitated towards it, observing that the haircut represented the opposite of what people had become accustomed to. British Vogue's Hannah Coates believes the style "ticked a lot of women's boxes", describing it as "long enough not to feel too risqué, and you could have shape and style without chopping all of your hair off". According to Hannah Morrill of Today, "The Rachel" appeared as though one could achieve it by raking a brush through it after getting out of bed, in stark contrast to the over-the-top "curled, primed, teased and overdone" hairstyles which "looked like they took a lot of time to get right" that had been the norm.

Hersheson theorized that the cut was particularly popular among members of Generation Z due to their fascination with the 1990s, while Taylor credits its resurgence in the 2020s to middle-aged people longing for the decade's youth. In 2017, Canalé suggested the haircut will be making a comeback because customers whose hair suffers from "aggressive coloring techniques" often turn towards collarbone-length styles, to repair damaged ends. In addition to its "more natural look", the colorist found that "The Rachel" "enhances your natural texture, and softens the face". Hair stylist Luke Williams felt the hairstyle is more flattering when the wear's hair has natural layers, believing this allows for more volume "by surrounding your face in a heart shape and framing it perfectly". Cartner-Morley observed that the haircut "based its appeal on being an everywoman cut, a style everyone could and did emulate with the help of a high-street salon and some hair straighteners". In a 2013 interview, Aniston said that despite not quite understanding the hairstyle's appeal herself, she believes "It's a big deal because ... a lot of people, a lot of gals, kind of thought was fun".

== Legacy ==
Due to its widespread impact on popular culture and women's fashion, "The Rachel" is widely considered to be one of the most famous hairstyles in fashion history, as well as one of the defining fashion trends of the 1990s and early 2000s. Entertainment Weekly declared it the most desired haircut of the Clinton era, as well as one of 25 fashion trends that impacted the entertainment industry. By as early as 2004, the year Friends ended, "The Rachel" had been voted the most influential haircut of all time by 2000 women polled by Morphy Richards, ahead of Fawcett, Princess Diana, Mary Quant and Marilyn Monroe. Best Life's Emerald Catron reported that the haircut was well known to the point where virtually any salon client could request it solely by name, while Evoke.ie's Laura Bermingham declared it "the 90s most famous hairstyle". The Daily Telegraph's Sian Ranscombe called it "one of the most famous haircuts of the 1990s... if not 20th century", whereas Refinery29's Megan Decker dubbed it arguably "the most-requested cut of all time". Mamamia contributor Jessica Clark wrote "There is arguably no hairstyle that is more iconic than those face-framing layers", joking that fans are still trying to grow out their own layers despite the show having ended several years earlier. Hairdressers Journal International reported that, during its peak, "The Rachel" had been emulated by at least 11 million women, and it remains the most popular hairstyle of all-time among British women. Kelsey Castañon of Refinery29 believes the look "defined the generation" beyond the 1990s, writing, "Fans spent the next two decades bringing in reference photos to their hairdressers". In 2021, Annie Vischer of Grazia observed that the haircut "continues to influence the outcome of hair appointments worldwide to this day". Regis Salons said "The Rachel" belongs to "a league all on its own", explaining, "If I asked you to name a hairstyle that's been as iconic as The Rachel, I'd probably have a long wait on my hands". Comparing it to hairstyles worn by Audrey Hepburn and Amy Winehouse, Insider's Rachel Hosie said "The Rachel" deserves its place among "iconic female hairstyles".

"The Rachel" is one of Friends' most enduring legacies, becoming a symbol that ultimately defined the show. Vanity Fair's Joanna Robinson wrote that it "cemented the sitcom early on as heavily influential when it came to style". Mental Floss writer Jason Serafino declared that Friends "reached its cultural zenith when it managed to transform a simple hairstyle into a global talking point, as untold millions of women in the '90s flocked to salons all wanting one thing". According to Yahoo! Style's Joanna Douglas, Aniston arguably possessed "the most famous head of hair in Hollywood" at the time of "The Rachel", which in turn bolstered her fame. Kaitlyn Frey of People dubbed it Aniston's "biggest pop culture hair moment of all time". Aniston has since become admired for her hair and hairstyles in general, which Us Weekly agrees began with "The Rachel". Mary Rector-Gable of BehindTheChair.com attributes the hairstyle's longevity to being "flattering on nearly everyone and suitable for nearly every type of hair", in addition to Aniston's appeal and relatability. The actress has remained famous for her hair even after transitioning from "The Rachel" into other hairstyles, with Insider's Melina Glusac explaining that "Aniston's hair has been under a microscope, with everyone eagerly awaiting what she (and longtime hair stylist Chris McMillan) will come up with next". Vogue's Lauren Valenti agreed that "The Rachel" cemented Aniston as the hair icon she continues to be. Elle Turner of Glamour said "You'd be hard-pressed to find a more iconic hairstyle from the last 25 years" than "The Rachel", describing it as "an icon in its own right". Aside from Aniston, countless prominent female celebrities are believed to have worn, emulated or adopted some version of the hairstyle at some point since its introduction.

"The Rachel" has remained popular for more than two decades since it debuted, with Beauty Crew's Erin Docherty writing in 2019 that the hairstyle does not appear to be "slowing down anytime soon". "The Rachel" is credited with bolstering McMillan's career and establishing him an in-demand celebrity hairstylist. Mary Rector-Gable of BehindTheChair.com observed that "even though Chris was already an established celebrity and editorial hairdresser in Southern California, the disruptive result of Jen Aniston and her layered haircut propelled him to a new stratosphere". In 2018, McMillan was awarded the Hairstylist of the Year Award from InStyle. Aniston presented the award to him, heavily referencing the Rachel in her presentation speech. In 2019, Canalé said he continues to see variations or styles reminiscent of "The Rachel" around the United States, ranging from "the one-length, chin-line bob, to layered cuts". from Aniston launched her own haircare line in 2021, which she said was inspired by the difficulty of maintaining "The Rachel".

Both The Independent and Vanity Fair observed that a Wikipedia article had been written for the hairstyle. In 2017, People included Trachtenberg's Entertainment Weekly photo in their book The 100 Best Celebrity Photos, with editor-in-chief Jess Cagle declaring "You can't put together the 100 Best Celebrity Photos of all time and not include 'The Rachel'." Cagle joked, "Today, Jennifer Aniston's haircut would have its own Twitter feed". In 2009, The Independent deemed actress Blake Lively's hairstyle from Gossip Girl the successor to "The Rachel".

== See also ==
- List of hairstyles
