= Dido flip =

Hairstyle

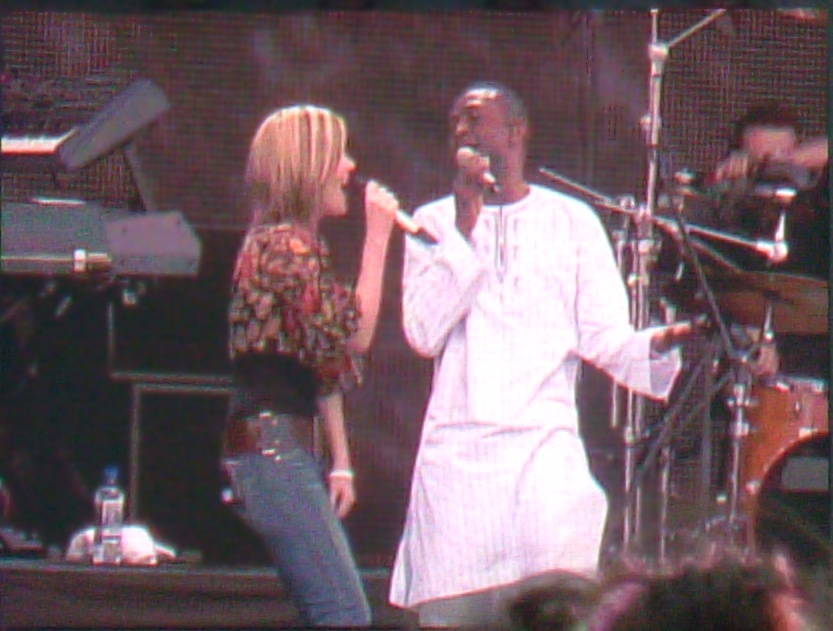
Dido with Youssou N'Dour at Live 8 concert in Hyde Park, London, July 2005

The Dido flip was a hairstyle of the early 21st century in imitation of the singer and songwriter Dido Armstrong. It was a "chopped" style with hair flipped to one or both sides and often strands not cut evenly. Dido noted in a number of interviews that she was surprised and interested by the attention she received over her hairstyle.

== Etymology ==
The first notable use of the term "Dido flip", was by The Sunday Times in a profile of the artist after she won two BRIT Awards in 2002. "Having a distinctive chopped hairstyle that has been widely copied as 'the Dido flip' attracts the paparazzi like hungry mosquitoes". Stylist Steven Ward, of New York's Garren Salon, described the flip as a "short choppy shag".

== Reactions ==
The Dido flip started to be perceived as a distinguishing feature of the artist. Dido herself was quoted as saying that she "love[d] it when [she] turn[ed] up at gigs and the first few rows all [had her] haircut". In 2006, in response to a question about fans focused on her looks, she elaborated, "I just make music and don't pay much attention to all that". Interviewed in 2013, shortly before the release of her fourth album, Girl Who Got Away, she referenced the excess attention her hair had received over the years.

A journalist who interviewed her shortly before the release of her second album, Life for Rent (2003), noted that "for a platinum-selling star she radiates normality .... She looks like any quietly stylish 31-year-old". Similarly, in 2004, The Observer described Dido's style of dress on stage as "high-street chic". However, in September 2007, the Daily Telegraph speculated as to whether "music's own Bridget Jones ... has, like her trademark boot-cut jeans and eponymous Dido-flip hair, fallen out of fashion".

The flip was sported for a time by Chelsea Clinton, daughter of the former US President Bill Clinton, at the time of Dido's rise to fame.

Having read this page, Dido commented in an interview with the Evening Standard on 22 November 2018: "No. It really freaked me out when I saw a Wikipedia page devoted to my hair."

== CD covers and materials ==
The Dido flip was not discernible on the cover of the artist's first album, No Angel (1999), on which her hair was combed back, and by the time of Life for Rent, her hair was longer. It could, however, be seen clearly on the cover of the CD single, "All You Want" (2001), and to a lesser extent on that of "Thank You" (2001). Photographs of Dido published in November 2008 with her third album, Safe Trip Home, showed a version of the flip that was slightly longer and shaggier than before.

== See also ==
- List of hairstyles
