= Undercut (hairstyle) =

Any hairstyle where the hair is shaved along a circular line above the ears

The undercut is a hairstyle that was fashionable from the 1910s to the 1940s, predominantly among men, and saw a steadily growing revival in the 1980s before becoming fully fashionable again in the 2010s. Typically, the hair on the top of the head is long and is often parted on either the side or center, while the back and sides are buzzed very short or shaved. It is closely related to the curtained hair of the mid-to-late 1990s, although those with undercuts during the 2010s tended to slick back and top gelled up the bangs away from the face.

== Origins ==
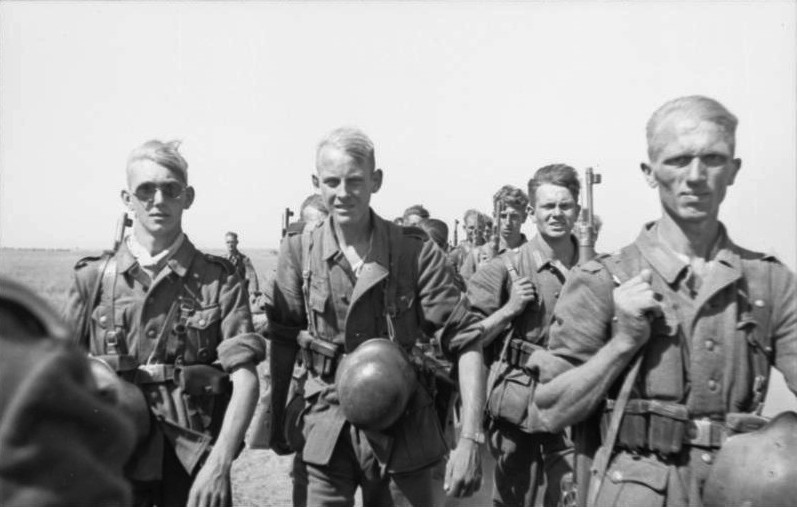
Wehrmacht soldiers with undercuts in 1942

Historically, the undercut has been associated with poverty and inability to afford a barber competent enough to blend in the sides, as on a short back and sides haircut. From the turn of the 20th century until the 1920s, the undercut was popular among young working-class men, especially members of street gangs. In interwar Glasgow, the Neds (precursors to the Teddy Boys) favored a haircut that was long on top and cropped at the back and sides. Despite the fire risk, much paraffin wax was used to keep the hair in place. Other gangs who favored this haircut were the Scuttlers of Manchester and the Peaky Blinders of Birmingham, because longer hair put the wearer at a disadvantage in a street fight.

During the Jazz Age of the 1920s and 1930s, hairstyles of this type were considered mainstream fashion. Military barbers of the World War I era gave short back and sides haircuts as fast as possible because of the numbers, under orders to facilitate personal hygiene in trench warfare, and as nearly uniform as possible, with an eye to appearance on parade. This made the short back and sides style the norm in the UK after 1918, and its variant the brush cut became common in North America and France. In Nazi Germany, a version of this haircut which was long on top but shaved at the back and sides was popular among Wehrmacht soldiers. The undercut remained common in the UK and America until the 1960s, when longer hair such as the wings haircut was popularised by the mod subculture and British Invasion bands such as The Beatles and The Rolling Stones.

== Revival ==
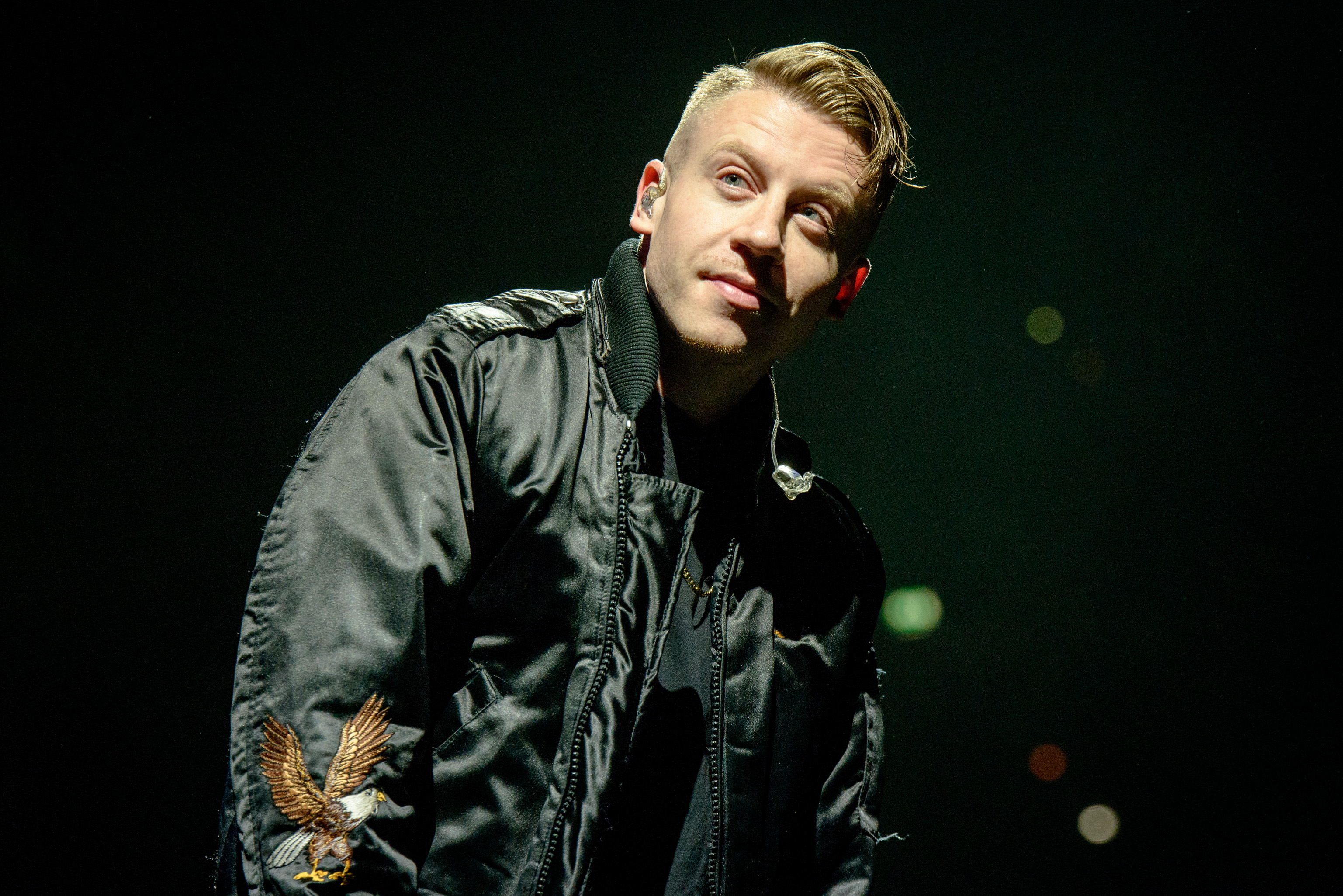
Macklemore with an undercut in 2016

Beginning in the late 1980s, centrally parted undercuts derived from the bowl cut made a comeback among fans of new wave, synthpop, and electronic music as an alternative to the mullets and backcombed hair of glam metal bands. A collar-length version of the bowl cut, known as curtained hair, went mainstream in the early 1990s and was worn by many celebrities, most notably Tom Cruise. Another variant, with a floppy permed fringe, was known as the "meet me at McDonald's haircut" due to its perceived popularity among young teenagers in the UK who socialise in and around McDonald's restaurants.

Curtained hair and undercuts went out of style in the early 2000s, but underwent a revival in the early 2010s among hipsters and skaters and Punk subculture who imitated the 1930s and 1940s version: longer with pomade in or swept to one side on top and shaved or clipped at the sides and with the shaved sides and the tops gelled up, At the time, although the style had many different names, the most controversial were the "Hitler Youth", "Jugend", and "fasci". Some of the most high-profile early adopters of this haircut included Macklemore, Kim Jong Un, David Beckham, and Win Butler.

During the late 2000s and early 2010s, undercuts were often associated with villainous movie characters such as Hannibal Lecter in Hannibal Rising, Johnny Depp's portrayal of gangster John Dillinger in Public Enemies, Jared Leto as The Joker in Suicide Squad, Guy Pearce in Lawless, and various German officers in war films. Characters from television series such as Jimmy Darmody on HBO's Boardwalk Empire and various characters from the BBC series Peaky Blinders were also associated with the undercut. By 2014, the haircut had become relatively mainstream in the UK and was worn by people not normally associated with the indie scene, such as reality television stars from shows like The Only Way Is Essex.

During the late 2010s, the American and Israeli press associated the undercut with alt-right agitators such as the American white supremacist Richard Spencer or the British far-right and anti-Islam activist Tommy Robinson and with neofascist supporters seeking a less intimidating alternative to the buzzcut.

== Gallery ==
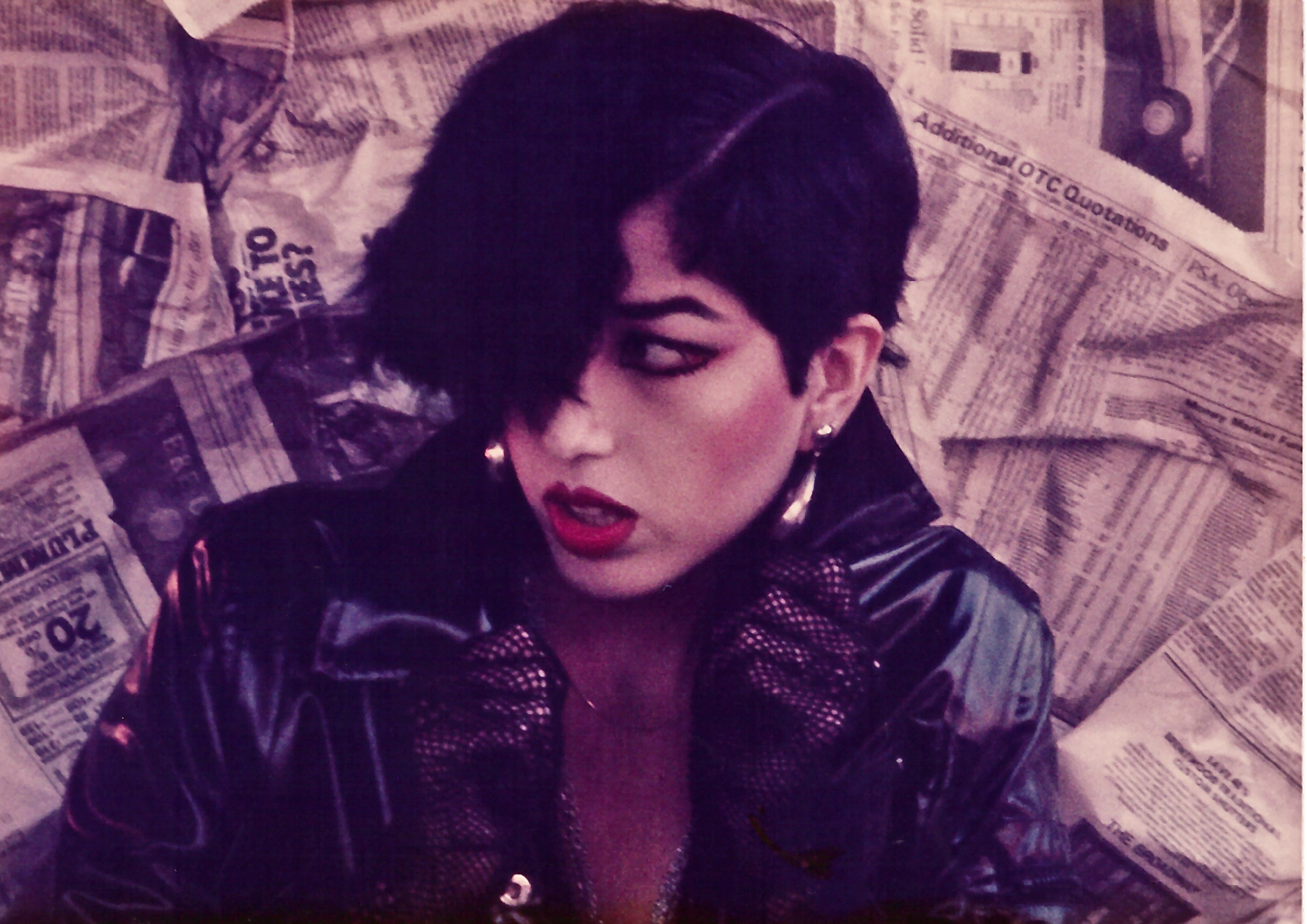
Alice Bag in the 1980s

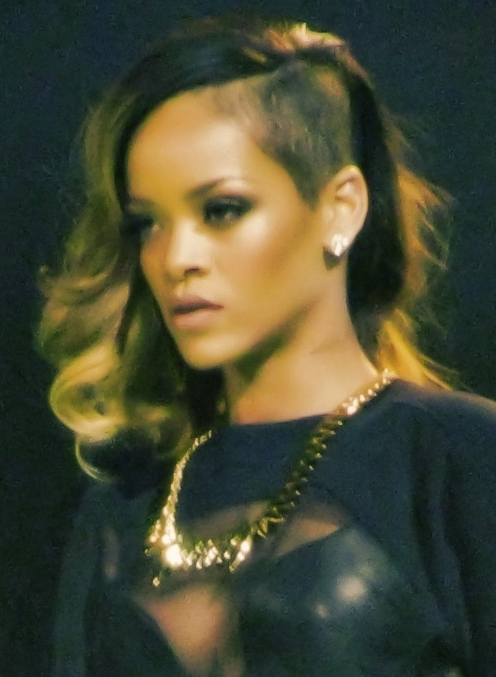
Rihanna with an undercut in 2013

== See also ==
- List of hairstyles
