= Frosted tips =

Hairstyle

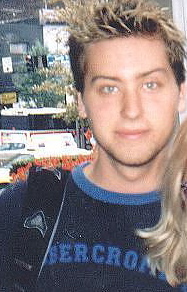
Singer Lance Bass in 2001, sporting frosted tips.

Frosted tips refers to a hairstyle in which the hair is cut short and formed into short spikes with hair gel or hair spray. The hair is bleached such that the tips of each spike will be pale blond, usually in contrast to the wearer's main hair color.

Frosted tips were prominent throughout the late 1990s and early 2000s.

Notable people who wore frosted tips include Eddie Guerrero, Justin Berfield, Lance Bass, Steven Bradbury, Aaron Carter, Zac Efron, Guy Fieri, Joe Jonas, Mark McGrath, and Justin Timberlake.

Other variants, such as inverted or "thawed" tips, where dark highlights are applied to the gelled ends of the person's hair that is otherwise heavily bleached.

== See also ==
- Hair highlighting
- List of hairstyles
