= Step cutting =

Hairstyle

Step cutting is a term used for a graduated haircut in which the hair takes the form of cascading steps. There is a sharp demarcation between the steps, which leads to the factor of having a "number of steps".

A 2-step cut is where the shortest layer is above the shoulders and the next one a few inches below. The layers are made to curl out.

Drastic variants of the cut can involve a very short first layer which is just below the ears. Doing this haircut is relatively easy—the hair is partitioned horizontally, and the lowest section serves as the guide.

== See also ==
- List of hairstyles
