= Surfer hair =

Tousled type of hairstyle

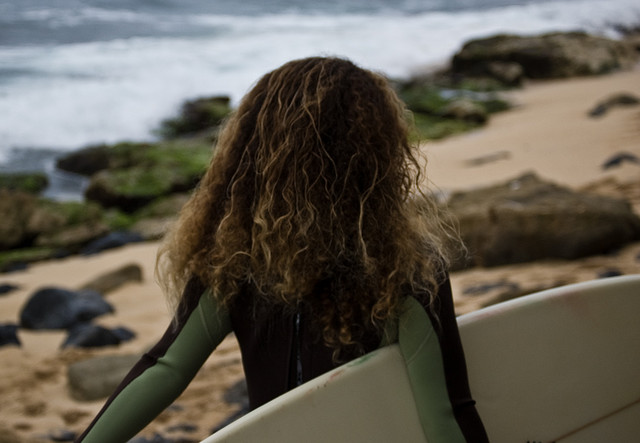
Frazzled, sun-damaged surfer hair.

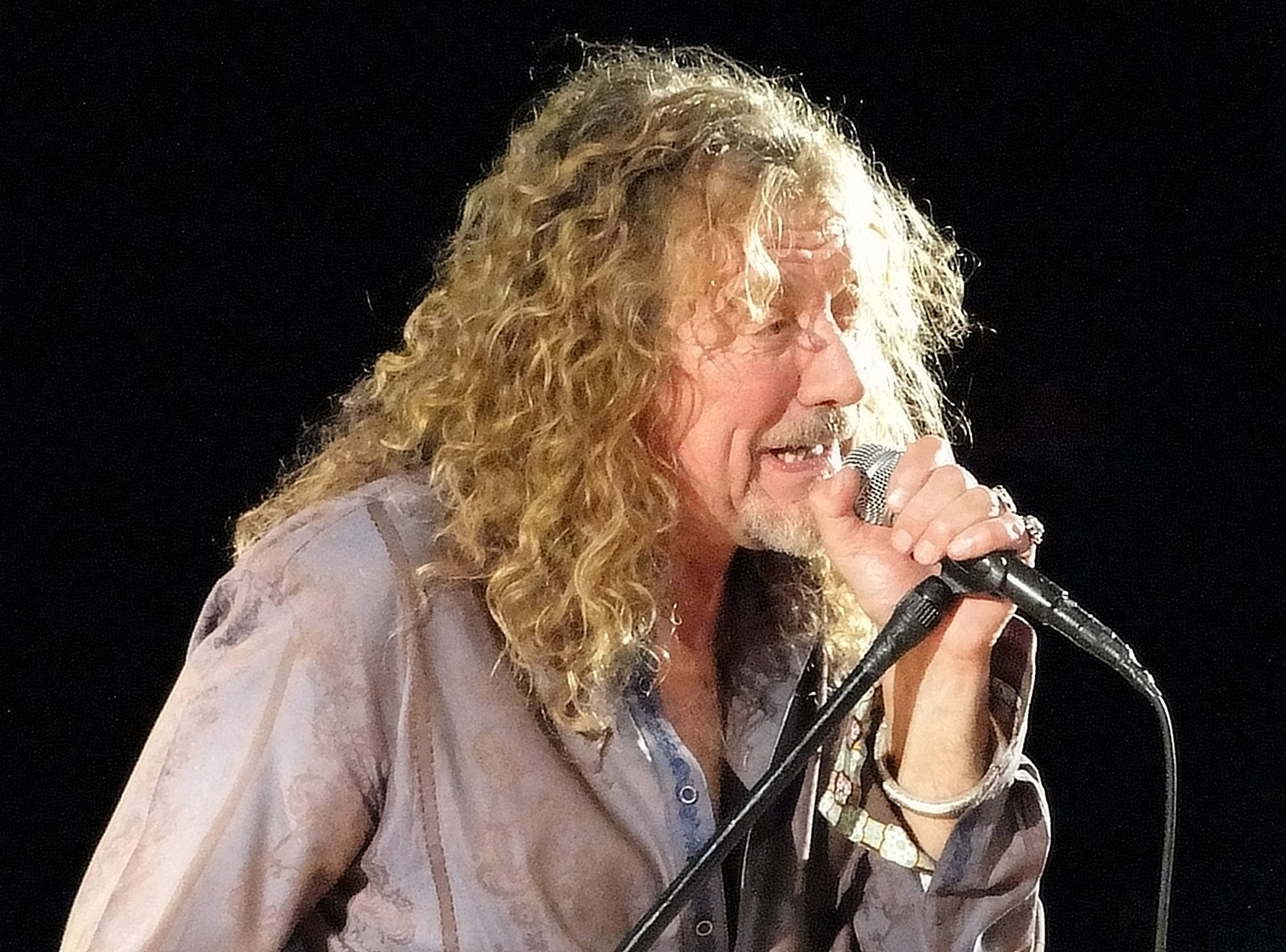
Robert Plant. The longer, curlier style was particularly popular in the late 1960s and 1970s.

Surfer hair is a tousled type of hairstyle, popularized by surfers from the 1950s onwards, traditionally long, thick and naturally bleached from high exposure to the sun and salt water of the sea. In the late 1960s and 1970s, the long hair and general lack of personal grooming was closely associated with hippie culture. Today, hairstyling companies brand their own hair gels, shampoos and hair wax to achieve the "surfer look" with hairstyles that are often shorter than traditionally, which often require more grooming to achieve the permanent hair lift or intentional windswept look. Amongst women, fashion magazines have referred to "sun streaked surfer hair" as a desirable look for women, although genuine surfer hair is often heavily damaged by the elements.

== Background ==
As early as 1950, Life magazine referred to the "beach bum" surfers of southern California. In 1963, Billboard described the emerging cultural "uniform" of the surfer with bleached blond hair and white Levi jeans, cut off at the knee. In 1965, Life magazine noted that the long surfer hair style and clothing (Levis) of surfers also transcended into skiing fashion. From the late 1960s to the 1980s in particular, especially at the time of the hippy, the surfer style was characterized by thick, long, bleached, often curly blond hair, bleached intensively by the sun and the saltwater. The hair of surfers is often damaged and bleached, brought about by frequent exposure to sunlight, humidity and salty water. Blonder or red headed individuals tend to be more affected, given that their pheomelanin is more sensitive.

By the late 1960s and early 1970s, the long haired surfer had become heavily stereotyped in the media (referred to as a "beach bum" or "surfer dude") as having a lack of discipline and self-indulgence and were described in an April 1971 issue of The Sun-Herald in Sydney as "jobless junkies". On the contrary, the modern surfer image has been described as rather less primitive in appearance, with many surfers now having jobs, driving posh cars and spending more time on personal grooming.

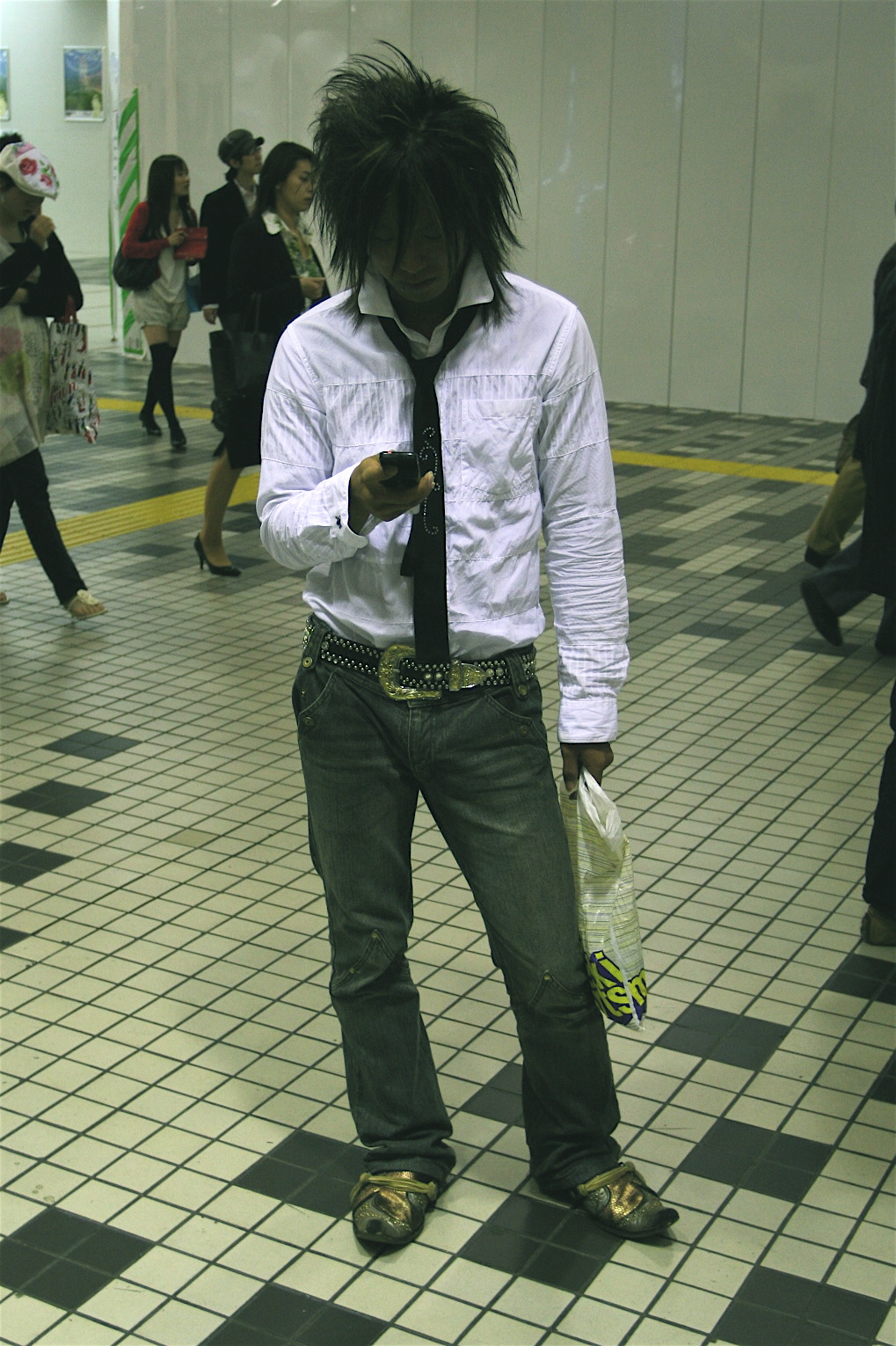
An example of the longer, spiky surfer hair style worn by many Japanese youths

In Japan, the surfer hair style and image became popular in the early 1980s, mostly by those who were not surfers. The style became known as saafaa, and the more extreme Japanese surfer haircut has been described as being "straight and combed forward with the back cut short". This is still popular amongst many Japanese youths today, with longer, spiky hair.

== Styling ==
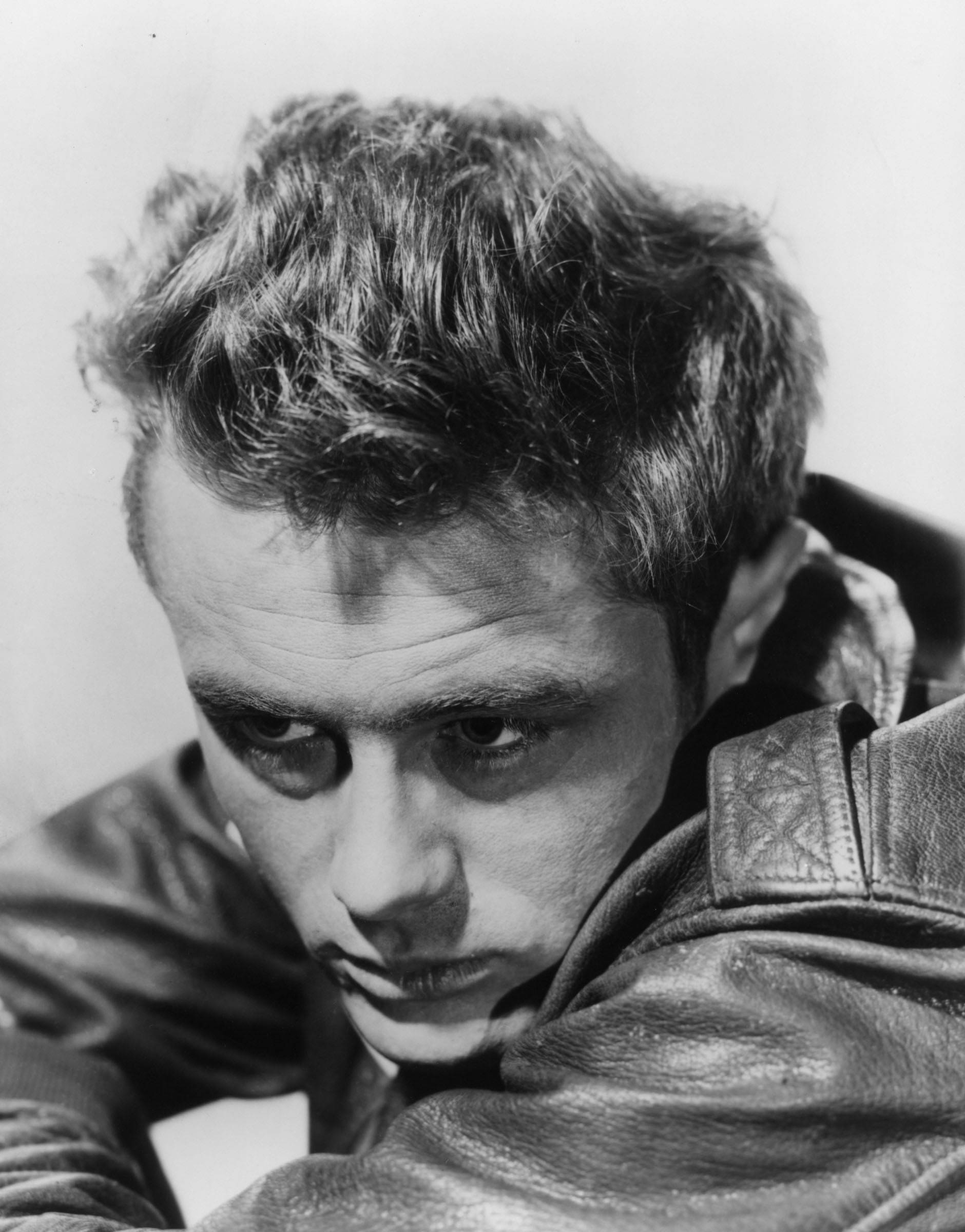
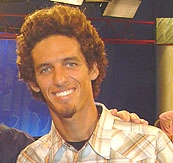
Left: James Dean. Right: Surfer Rob Machado. These are examples of the modern surfer bouffant hairstyle.

Traditionally, the surfer hairstyle has been one with little regard to personal grooming; unkempt, wild, long, carefree and at one with nature. However, since the late 1990s, a shorter style, typically with a distinctly elevated quiff, has emerged amongst young men, fashioned in a style similar to James Dean. This style often requires more grooming and back combing and the heavy use of hair gels or waxes to achieve the permanent hair lift or intentional windswept look. A July 2003 article by Cincinnati Magazine described the modern surfer hair trend as "men growing out their hair, not long, but short with texture; the edges are more undone and natural, not blunt." Other variations of the style are the 90s curtains style with a floppy fringe with far less application of gel, worn by people such as Phil Vassar, Sebastián Rulli, Andy Griggs, Laird Hamilton, Taylor Hawkins, Keith Urban and Alex Band and the heavy layered fringe and mullet style, worn by people such as Owen Wilson, Jon Bon Jovi, and Mike Ransom.

== Cultural popularity ==
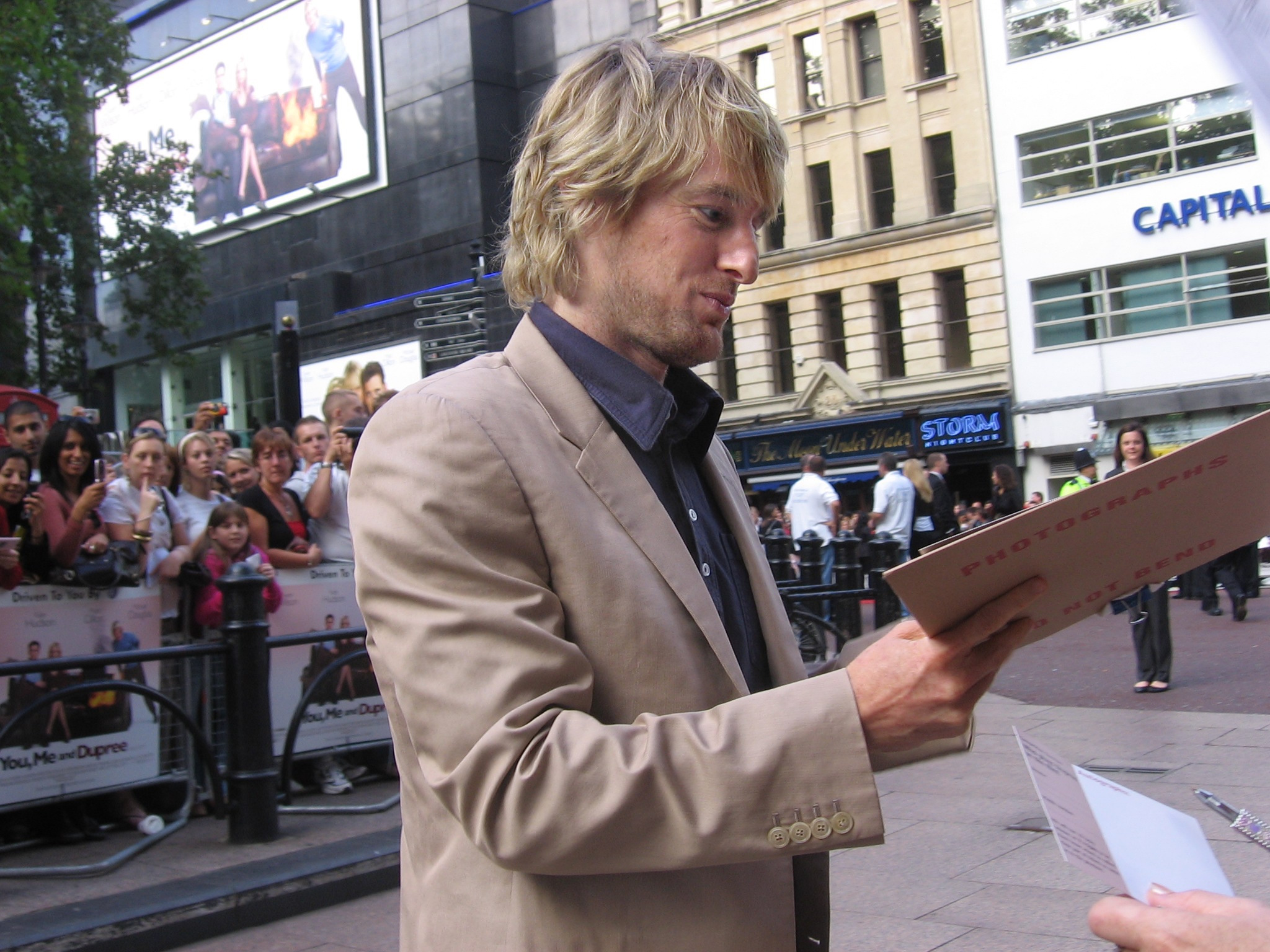
Actor Owen Wilson wearing the mid-length surfer hair common among his British and American peers from the mid-2000s onwards

Since the late 1990s, hairstyling companies have branded their own hair gels, shampoos and hair wax to achieve the "surfer look". Hair gel companies began manufacturing stronger holding hair products and adverts began to feature more extreme styles with the tagline "Get surfer hair" to sell the product. Many exhibiting the style today use artificial bleach on their hair rather than letting the sun bleach it naturally and maintain a more refined appearance. The surfer style is often associated with a heartthrob or "pretty boy" male image. Numerous media have capitalized upon this image and surfing culture, from American shows such as Malibu, CA, Baywatch and teen-oriented films, to a number of Australian soaps, such as Home and Away. One actor in Hollywood who is particularly known for his surfer image and hair is Matthew McConaughey, who even played the lead role in a 2008 film named Surfer, Dude. With women, "sun streaked surfer hair" has been referred to in fashion magazines such as Elle as a desirable look. In Maui, the frazzled, knotted, sun-bleached hair is also considered a desirable trait amongst many female surfers.

== See also ==
- Shag
- List of hairstyles
