= Lob (haircut) =

Type of haircut

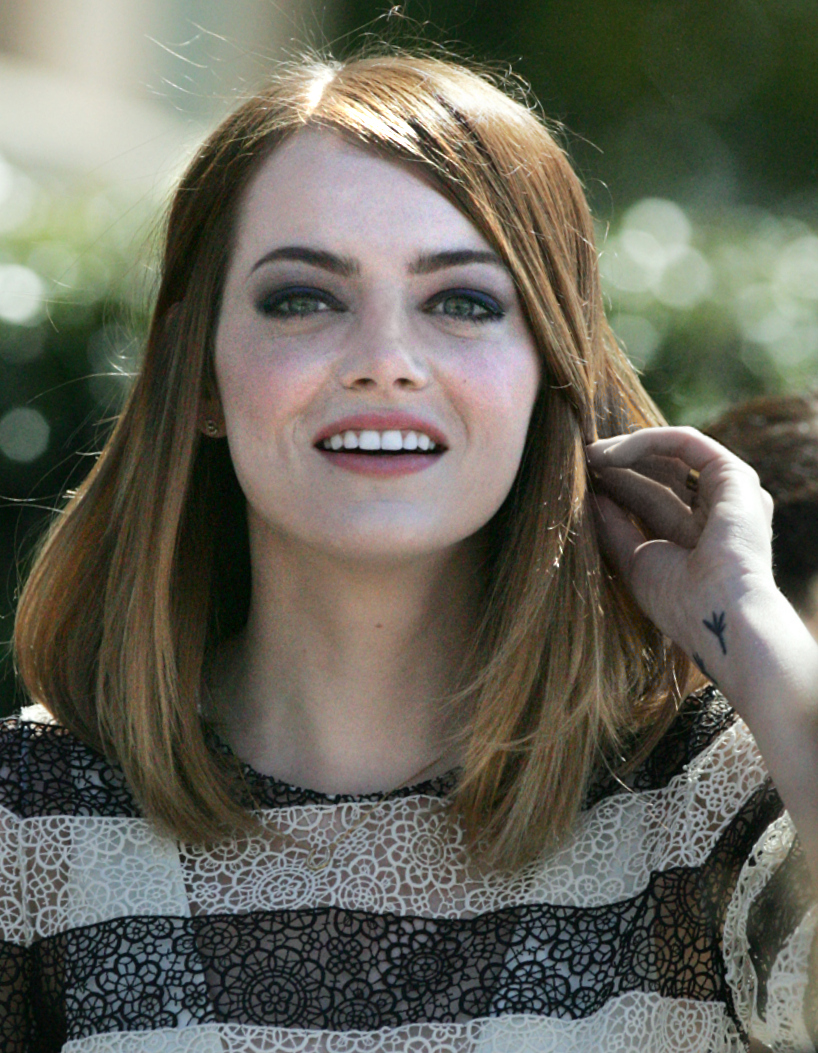
Emma Stone in 2014

A lob or long bob is a medium-length haircut and a variant of bob cut. The length is between long hair and a bob cut.

The lob is cut just above the shoulders, at shoulder level or just below.

In the 1920s, many women were choosing to cut their hair into the bob. Towards the end of the decade, and the start of the Great Depression, a more womanly look was in style, over the flat-chested boyish fashions of the flapper era. Hairstyles echoed this, and were worn slightly longer, often in a pageboy. During World War II, it was fashionable to grow one's hair long again, but longer bobs were still in fashion, often with victory rolls in the wake of the allied victory.

During the 1960s, the bob returned, albeit much less sharp and graphic. This look has remained popular into the 21st century, and the lob came into vogue, as it is, essentially, a long bob.

== See also ==
- List of hairstyles
