= Hairstyles in the 1980s =

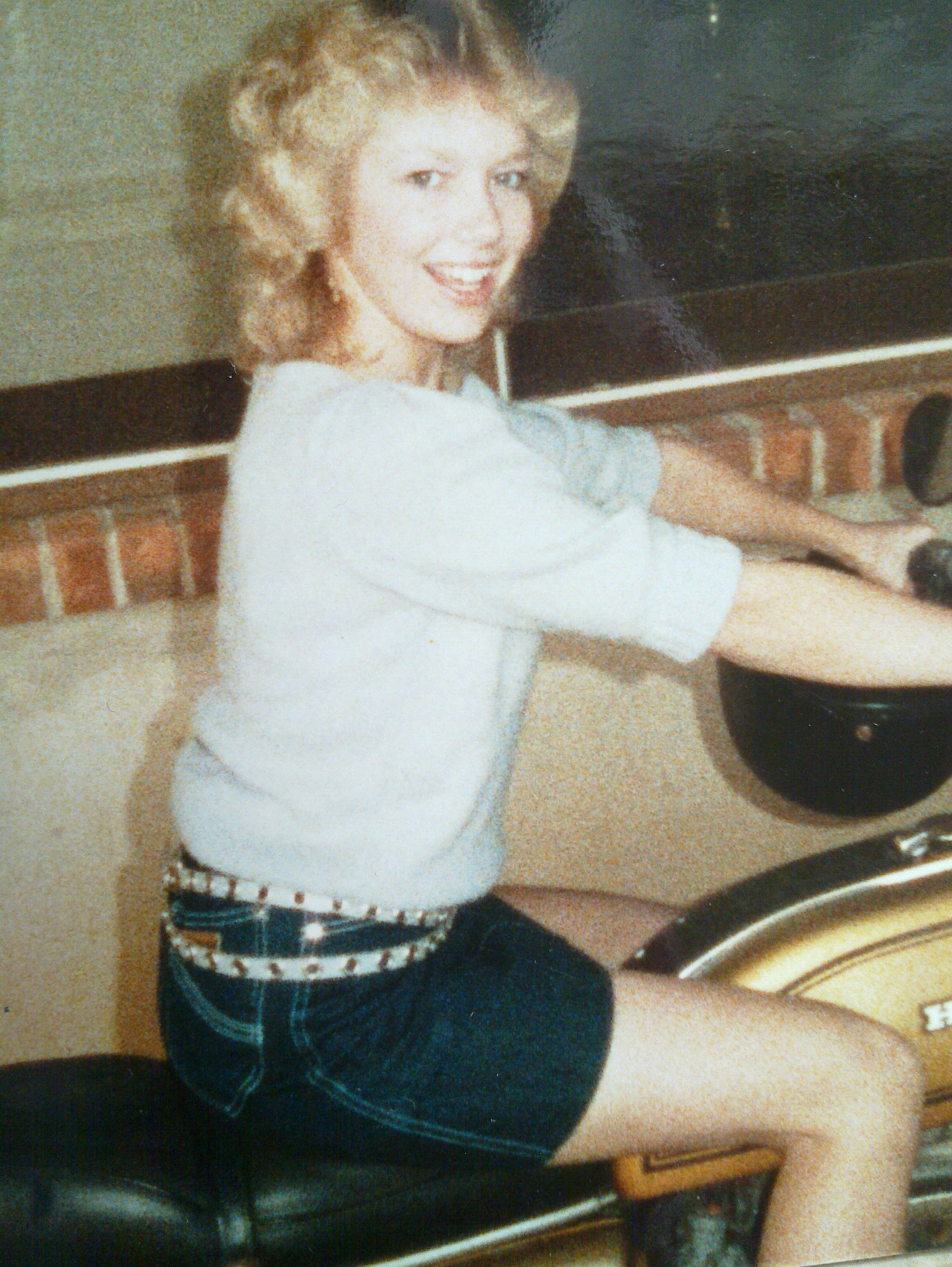
Permed hair on a young woman in the 1980s

Hairstyles in the 1980s included the mullet, tall mohawk hairstyles, jheri curls, flattops, and hi-top fades, which became popular styles. Amongst women, large hair-dos, puffed-up styles, permanent waves, and softer cuts typified the decade. Big hair that was "often permed to achieve the desired volume" is especially associated with women of the mid 1980s as well as male rockstars of that era, especially of the glam metal genre. Television shows such as Dynasty helped popularize the high volume bouffant and glamorous image associated with it.

== Categories ==
=== Cuts ===
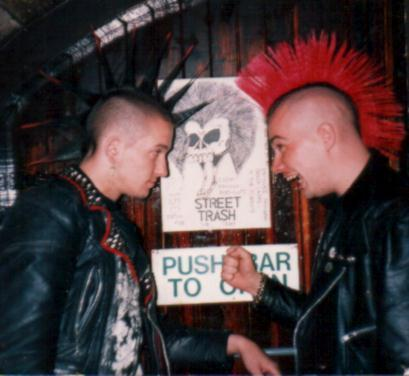
Liberty spikes (left) and crimson Mohawk (right)

Totally shaved heads gained popularity among men. The sideburns of the 1960s and 1970s saw a massive decline in fashion in late 1970s. Big and eccentric hair styles were popularized by film and music stars, in particular amongst teenagers. Although straight hair was the norm at the beginning of the decade, as many late 1970s styles were still relevant, by around 1982 the perm had come into fashion. This was in large part due to many movies released at the time, as well as possibly being a rebellious movement against the 1970s. In 1984, sideburns made a comeback but were slightly thinner and shorter, and better groomed than those of the 1970s, lasting until the end of 1986. These sideburns were usually (but not always) used as an add-on to the mullet haircut. Spiked hair, teased hair, brightly colored hair, and shaved hair sections were popularized in the 1980s by the punk movement, as were the Mohawk and its twisted variant, Liberty spikes.

The Mullet haircut existed in several different styles, all characterized by hair short on the sides and long in the back. Mullets were popular in suburban and rural areas among working class men. This contrasted with a conservative look favored by business professionals, with neatly groomed short hair and very short sideburns for men and sleekly straight hair for women. White collar men's haircuts were often shaved at the nape of the neck to create an artificially even hairline. Women's hairstyles became increasingly long in the latter part of the decade and blunt cuts dominated. Blunt cuts of the late 1980s brought long hair to an equal length across the back. Bangs were popular, with "mall bangs", attributed to teenage girls who frequented shopping malls, were styled by ratting bangs into peaks or mounds, and then using hairspray to keep them in place.

In Japan, the Seiko-chan cut, worn by Seiko Matsuda, was popular.

=== Chemical treatments ===
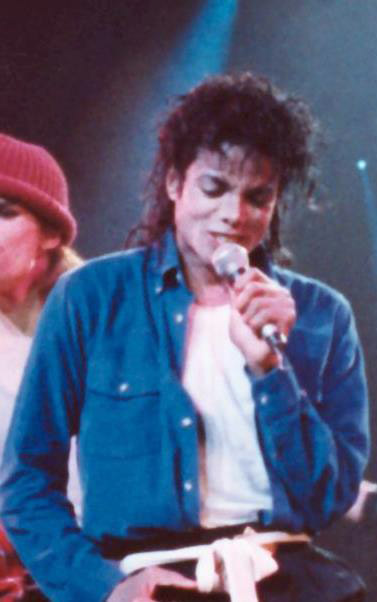
Michael Jackson with Jheri curl in 1988

Many young women in Europe and North America dyed their hair a rich burgundy or plum-red in the last half of the decade. Auburns and reds were favored by those who aspired to emulate Molly Ringwald. But non-traditional haircolors, such as bright blue, crimson, green, and shocking pink gained favor from the punk subculture. Chemical hair treatment was popularized by the perm hairstyle, which resulted in soft, full curls. By the late 1980s, the permed bouffant had become highly fashionable among women of all walks of life, notably Princess Diana. The long, permed hair look was particularly popular amongst male rock stars of this period, associated with heavy metal and glam metal bands of this era such as Mötley Crüe, Bon Jovi, and Whitesnake.

=== Styling techniques ===
During the middle and late 1980s it was unfashionable to part either men's or women's hair as the perm made the center parting look unattractive. Mousse was used in styling an individual's hair to attain a desired shiny look and greater volume; some mousse even contained glitter. Hairsprays such as Aqua Net were also used in quantity. Artificial dreadlock extensions were inspired by the Rastafari movement. Michael Jackson wore his hair in Jheri curl style in the 1980s; it was popular among African Americans in the early decade, but its popularity waned by the end of the decade, with the hi-top fade partly replacing it. Hair gel was used by young men to effect the preppy look of a well groomed, short hair style. Crimped hair was as fashionable as the large wave.

== Accessories ==
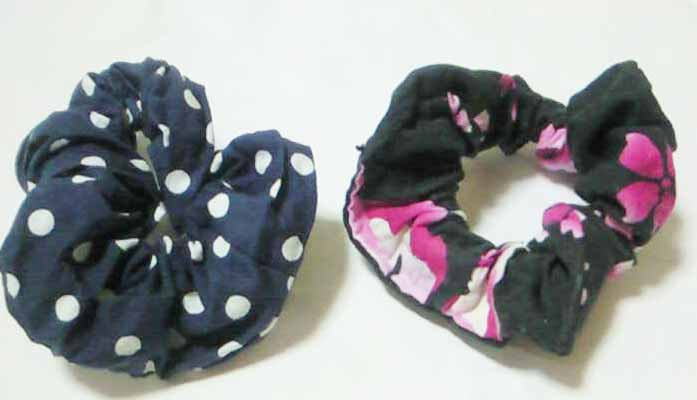
Scrunchies hair bands

Scrunchies and headbands made of elastic and cloth were popular in all different colors, styles, and patterns. Scrunchies were very popular in the side ponytail hair style. "Banana clips" were another favorite, pulling hair back into a fanned out style. Other accessories include barrettes and bows. Sweatbands were also major, usually worn with sweatband on the wrist and legwarmers on the legs.

== Facial ==
The trend in moustaches and full beards carried over from the late-1970s and into the early-1980s but waned as the decade progressed. From the mid to late-1980s, clean-shaven faces with short or no sideburns was the norm. However, the success of Miami Vice did spark a trend in the facial hair style called designer stubble.

== See also ==
- List of hairstyles
