= List of hairstyles =

This is a non-exhaustive list of hairstyles, excluding facial hairstyles.

== Short hairstyles ==
Name	Image	Description
Bob cut		A classic short hairstyle where it is cut above the shoulders in a blunt cut with typically no layers. This style is most common among women.
Bouffant		A style distinguished by smooth hair that is heightened and given extra fullness over teasing in the fringe area.
Bowl cut		Named for the shape of the style as much as for a once-common method of achieving it (i.e. using a bowl to style the cut by placing it on the head and trimming the open hair). Moe Howard from The Three Stooges has this hairstyle for his trademark and Henry V of England had a similar hairstyle. This hairstyle was popular in the United States (for straight hair textures) during the late 1980s and early 1990s.
Broccoli haircut		Named for its visual similarity to a floret of broccoli. It is associated with boys in Generation Z and gained popularity through Internet memes on TikTok.
Bunches		Another name for pigtails worn braided or unbraided.
Butch cut		A butch is a type of haircut in which the hair on the top of the head is cut short in every dimension. The top and the upper portion of the back and sides are cut the same length, which generally ranges between 5 millimeters (.25 in) and 20 millimetres (.75 in), following the contour of the head. The hair below the upper portion of the sides and back of the head is tapered short or semi-short with a clipper, in the same manner as a crew cut.
Buzz cut		A buzz cut, or wiffle cut, whereby the hair is very short and typically cut with manual hair clippers.
Caesar cut		The Caesar cut is a men's hairstyle that is cut to a regular fade with the bangs or fringe left longer than the top length.
Chonmage		A variation on the traditional topknot and tonsure of samurai in Feudal Japan, today worn by sumo wrestlers. Unlike the samurai tonsure, the top of the head is never shaved for this hairstyle.
Comb over		Hair that is combed from one part of the head to another, often to cover up a bald spot.
Conk		A hairstyle where Afro-textured hair is straightened. This was popular among African-American men from the 1920s to 1960s.
Crew cut		A crew cut or G.I. haircut is a type of haircut in which the hair on the top of the head is cut relatively short, measured in length from the longest hair that forms a short pomp (pompadour) at the front hairline to the shortest at the back of the crown. The hair on the sides and back of the head is usually tapered short, semi-short or medium.
Curtained hair		Curtained hair is the term given to the hairstyle featuring a long fringe divided in either a middle parting or a side parting. The hairstyle was popular on adolescents and men from the late 1980s until the mid-1990s.
Dido flip		A "short choppy shag", popularized by British pop singer Dido.
Ducktail		A hairstyle predominantly favored by men, though some young female fans of Elvis Presley wore a similar look in his heyday. The style required that the hair were combed back around the sides of the head. The teeth edge of a comb was then used to define a central parting flowing from the crown to the nape at the back of the head, resembling, to many, the rear end of a duck. The hair on the top front of the head was usually that of a pompadour. The sides on back were styled to resemble the folded wings of the duck.
Edgar cut		A short hairstyle where the front hair has bangs and the sides are tapered.
Eton crop		A more extensive version of a short crop, with the hair at the back cut close and the front hair left longer for styling.
Fauxhawk		Also known as the 'fashion punk cut', the hairstyle is an approximation of a mohawk made without shaving or 'buzzing' the hair on the sides of the head, thus allowing an imitation of the look of a real mohawk not having to commit to removing most of one's hair. The name is a portmanteau of faux, the French word for false or fake, and 'mohawk'.
Flattop		A type of crew cut where the hair on the top of the head is cut as a flat plane giving a levelled 'flat-topped' look.
French crop		A haircut which is short at the sides and back, and medium length at the crown, worn with a fringe.
Frosted tips		A men's hairstyle (though women have adopted as well) in which the hair is cut short and formed into short spikes with hair gel or hair spray. The hair is bleached such that the tips of each spike will be light blond, usually in contrast to the wearer's main hair color. Frosted tips were prominent throughout the late 1990s. The style, without the coloring was also common and commonly just called "short and spiky".
Hi-top fade		The hair is cut short on the sides and is grown long on the top. This style was popular among African-American youth and men in the late 1980s and early 1990s.
High and tight		A military variant of the crew cut.
Induction cut		A haircut given to recruits being inducted into military service. It is similar to a buzz cut.
Ivy League		An Ivy League, also known as a Harvard Clip or Princeton, is a type of crew cut in which the hair on the top of the head is long enough to style with a side part.
Marcel waves		Deep waves made in short hair by a heated curling iron.
Mohawk		Hair that is shaved or buzzed on the sides leaving a strip of hair in the middle. It is often spiked up.
Mop-Top		A mid-length haircut that has a fringe (bangs) that brushes over the forehead, collar length at back, with the ears partly covered by the hair, dependent on style. Was made popular by The Beatles (John Lennon, Paul McCartney, George Harrison, and Ringo Starr)
Pageboy		A longer version of a bob, typically worn with a fringe (bangs) and reaching shoulder-length or a bit longer.
Pixie cut		A very short women's hairstyle with or without a shaggy fringe (bangs).
Pompadour		The hair is swept upwards from the face and worn high over the forehead, and sometimes upswept around the sides and back as well. The style, named after Madame de Pompadour (1721–1764), mistress of King Louis XV, is for both women and men.
Quiff		The quiff combines the 1950s pompadour hairstyle, the 1950s flat-top, and, sometimes a mohawk. The hairstyle was an essential in the British 'Teddy Boy' movement, and became popular again in Europe in the early 1980s and 2010s. Recently examples of people wearing quiffs are Alex Turner and Matt Helders of Arctic Monkeys, Tom Meighan of Kasabian, Eugene McGuinness, Bruno Mars, Nick Grimshaw, and One Direction
El Siete, or, El 7 Colombiano (The Seven)		Originated in Medellín, Colombia as a variation on the 'mullet'. Right angles in the shape of the number "7" are shaved into the sides of the head, while the rest of the hair remains uniform in length.
Shape-up		Also called a "line-up". Hair that has an even line across the forehead and then turns sharply at a 90-degree angle and blends with the sideburns. It can be worn with almost any other hairstyle. Primarily worn by Latinos and some African Americans. Well-known examples include Canadian hip-hop artist Drake and Vinny Guadagnino from MTV's Jersey Shore.
Shaved head		A shaved head is whereby the hair on the scalp is completely shaven resulting in a bald look.
Skin fade		Similar to a typical fade, except the hair is faded down to the skin.
Slicked-back		Hair that is combed back, away from the forehead, then held in place with a hairstyling product.
Titus cut		A short layered cut, typically with curls. Popular in the late 18th and early 19th centuries.
Tonsure		Traditionally worn by monks in the Middle Ages, still worn by some traditional monks today.
Two block		The two block hairstyle is characterised by a "voluminous crown" of hair on the top of the head, with neatly cropped sides (or undercuts) on the sides and back, resulting in "a handsome layered style". Also known as the Korean bowl cut, the hairstyle is popular with Asian men who have thick straight hair, and has become synonymous with K-pop and South Korean celebrity culture. The hairstyle gets its name from the hair being cut into two distinct "blocks", on the top and bottom.
Undercut		The undercut is a gendered haircut whereby the top section of hair is held in place whilst the side and back sections are cut, thus making the top longer and the back and sides undercutting. See also bowl cut
Waves		Short-haired waves, shortened to just waves, is a very common and sought after hairstyle for African-American men that create the appearance of water-like waves in the hair.
Wings		This style can range from long and hanging below the eyes, to a shorter length. Instead of lying on the wearer's ears, the hair flips up and comes straight out like an airplane wing, hence the name. Popular amongst the skateboarding, surfer and preppy communities. Also known as a 'mod cut'.

== Long hairstyles ==
Long hairstyles may be considered those which reach beyond the shoulders on women, or require long hair to create, and past the chin on men.

Name	Image	Description
Afro		A style of natural African hair that has been grown out without any straightening or ironing, and combed regularly with special afro picks. In recent history, the hairstyle was popular through the late 1960s and 1970s in the United States.
Beehive		Backcombing or teasing with hairspray to style hair on top of the head so that the size and shape is suggestive of a beehive, hence the name.
Bangs		Bangs (or fringe) straight across the high forehead, or cut at a slight U-shape.
Big hair		Any hairstyle with large volume, though this is generally a description given to hair with a straight texture that is blown out or "teased" into a large size. The increased volume is often maintained with the use of hairspray or other styling products that offer hold.
Blowout		A long hairstyle for women that is used with rich products and blown dry from the roots to the ends.
Brush cut		Brush cut is an alternative name for a longer butch cut, especially one that shows natural curl.
Bun		A hairstyle where the hair is arranged into a knot, usually at the back, crown, or top of the head. See also chignon.
Chignon		A specific type of bun that is smoothly wrapped at the base of the neck.
Croydon facelift		A tight ponytail worn at the top of the head, giving the effect of a facelift as it pulls the facial skin upwards. Often inappropriately referred to as a "top knot" (though this term, in its original context, actually refers to a chonmage).
Crown braid		A crown braid or crown plait is a braided hairstyle historically popular with European women, usually worn by women with long hair, consisting of a braid wrapped up around the head. It is the signature hairstyle worn by Ukrainian politician Yulia Tymoshenko. It is also similar to some of the hairstyles worn by Frida Kahlo. See also braid or plait.
Double buns		Two buns worn at either side of the head, popularized by Carrie Fisher (Princess Leia) of Star Wars fame.
Devilock		The sides and back are kept short while the front is grown long and combed forward. Well known in certain punk rock subcultures due to its use being commonly associated to Misfits bassist Jerry Only.
Fallera hairdo		A Valencian fallera hairstyle is a traditional women's hairstyle typical of Valencia and its Falles celebration, and is reminiscent of the "Princess Leia hairstyle" of Star Wars fame. It is an elaborate hairstyle consisting of two spiralled buns on either side of the head and two braids blew around the back of the head, with twisted strands of hair in different forms in the middle of the braids. This hairstyle is reminiscent of the one found on the ancient statue of the Lady of Elx.
Flipped-up ends		A women's style that was popular in the 1960s. Characterized by upward curling ("flipped") ends. Cybill Shepherd wore it as a beauty queen in 1966.
Feathered hair		Feathered hair was popular in the 1970s and the early 1980s with both men and women. The hair was grown long on both sides (normally covering the ears, although it could be down to the shoulders), left unlayered (although some men with curly hair did have it layered) with either a side or a center parting.
Fontange		Also called "commode" in England, the fontange hairstyle was popular among women in the second half of the 17th century. In the hairstyle, a cap arranged with ruffled lace, ribbons, and other accessories adorned high-piled, curled hair.
French braid		A French braid is a braid that appears to be braided "into" the hair, often described as braided backwards—strands, going over instead of under as in a Dutch braid.
French twist		A hairstyle wherein the hair is twisted behind the head into a sort of bun style.
Fringe (bangs)		Hair that is combed to the front of the head and cut at or above the eyebrows.
Half crown		Alternative and historic name for a semi-short taper.
Half updo		Popularized in the 1960s by sex icons like Brigitte Bardot, this women's hairstyle requires medium-length or longer hair. The hair is divided from the temples back and then fixed into bun, chignon or ponytail to secure into place (therefore, half the hair is in an 'updo'). If a woman has a fringe, that area is usually left free and never pulled into the 'updo'.
Hime cut		A Japanese hairstyle that consists of long straight hair that reaches at least below the shoulder blades with part of it cut to about shoulder-length and a fringe (bangs) that reaches the eyebrows.
Jewfro		A Jewish variant of the 'Afro' hairstyle. Alternatively called the "Isro".
Jheri curl		Hair that is curly and kept moist (or at least a wet-look maintained) by a Jheri curl activator. This style was popular in the 1980s especially with African-Americans, including Michael Jackson and Rick James.
Layered hair		A women's hairstyle where different sections of the hair are cut at different lengths to give the impression of layers.
Liberty spikes		Hair that is grown out long and spiked up usually with a gel
Lob		A shoulder-length hairstyle for women, much like a long bob, hence the name.
Mullet		Hair that is short in front and long in the back. Often described as "business in the front, party in the back".
Odango		A hairstyle where two buns are worn on either side of the head. A popular version also has two ponytails protruding from the buns. The most well-known example of this style is worn by the titular character of the Japanese anime Sailor Moon. It is also commonly referred to as "space buns" or "afro puffs", the latter of which has been popularized in the African-American community.
Oseledets		A haircut consisting of a long tuft or lock of hair left on top of the shaven head, associated with Cossacks. Ukrainian professional boxer and former undisputed world cruiserweight and heavyweight champion Oleksandr Usyk has worn Oseledets during some of his professional boxing matches, including during Oleksandr Usyk vs Anthony Joshua II.
Payot		Sidelocks or earlocks, worn by some males in the Orthodox Jewish community.
Perm		Hair that is chemically treated to retain curl (curly perm) or lie straight (straight perm). New hair is not affected by the chemical treatment and will grow out naturally.
Pigtails		Hair that is divided into two equal sections and is then either braided or secured close to the scalp and left to hang free.
Ponyhawk		1. A combination of a mohawk with a ponytail in the back.; 2. Long hair worn in several ponytails running from front of the head to the back of the head resembling a mohawk. Unlike a usual mohawk, hair is not cut from the sides. The word is a portmanteau of 'ponytail' and 'mohawk'.
Ponytail		When all of the hair is collected and fixed with a hair tie or clip close to the scalp, with the hair hanging free, resembling the tail of a pony.
Psychobilly wedge		The psychobilly wedge is a sort of a mixture between a mohawk hairstyle and the pompadour. The hair along the side of the head is shaved and the middle is not spiked but slicked back and fashioned in a pompadour.
Queue		Hair is worn long and gathered up into a ponytail, often braided. It was worn traditionally by the Manchu people of Manchuria (and their male Han Chinese subjects during the Qing dynasty) and certain Native American groups.
The Rachel		A square-layered haircut popularized by Jennifer Aniston (Rachel Green) on the 1990s sitcom Friends.
Rattail		Hair that has been grown out long and shorn, or 'buzzed' except for a long, thin braid at the very top of the neck.
Razor cut		Includes choppy short layers, thinned at the bottom. Not dissimilar from "emo" hair. Usually has a side-sweep fringe.
Ringlets		A tightly curled hairstyle.
Shag cut		A choppy layered hairstyle, characterized by layers to create fullness in the crown and fringes around the edges. There are many versions including the frat shag and boy's shag. In the 2020s, a variation of the shag called a wolf cut became popular. This variation differentiates itself by being shorter at the front in a style reminiscent of the mullet and often includes bangs. The wolf cut has been worn by celebrities including Billie Eilish, Camila Cabello and Miley Cyrus.
Shingle bob		A dome-shaped short haircut with the bottom razored into a V shape.
Step cut		A measured style in which the hair takes the form of cascading steps.
Surfer hair		A tousled hairstyle.
Tail on back		A men's hairstyle made by growing the hair out in the back like a small tail. It is widely seen in India. See Rattail.
Updo		An updo is the hairstyle in which the hair is twisted or pulled up.
Weave		Similar to extensions, but the hairpiece is sewn or braided in for longer or thicker hair.

== Any-length styles ==
Name	Image	Description
Asymmetric cut		A haircut where the hair is longer on one side. In the 1980s and 1990s, asymmetric was a popular staple of Black hip hop fashion, among women and men.
Braid or Plait		A braid, also known as a plait, is a type of hairstyle usually worn by women with long hair in which all or part of one's hair is separated into strands, normally three, and then plaited or braided together, typically forming one braid hanging down at the back of the head or two braids hanging down on either side of the head. Braids can also be strengthened or lengthened with the addition of weaving hair. Braids may also serve as the base for sewing on additional weave hair on top of the braid for additional hair styling options. See also cornrows (below), queue, crown braid (under Long Hair, above), French (or Dutch) braid and pigtail.
Cornrows		A hairstyle originating from Sub-Saharan Africa, popularized by African Americans wherein the hair is braided into a series of locks that cling to the head.
Dreadlocks		The hair is 'dreadlocked' into individual sections using one of several methods, usually either backcombing, braiding, hand rolling, or locking in the roots. Dreadlocks can vary in size, tightness, and length. Dreadlocks are associated most closely with Rastafarians.
Extensions		Either natural or synthetic locks of hair secured to the head, either by taping, clipping, or sewn in, giving the wearer the appearance of having longer and thicker hair.
Finger waves		Hair is set into waves using lotion and a comb.
Fishtail hair		Hair is worn in a braid resembling a fish's tail.
Highlights		Small strands of hair are dyed lighter than the rest of the hair, mimicking the natural bleaching of sun-damaged hair.
"Natural" (African)		A typical texture of Black African hair that has not been altered by hot combs, flat irons, or chemicals (by perming, relaxing, or straightening). Each strand of this hair type grows in a tiny spring-like, corkscrew shape (though there are different textures and degrees of waviness, curliness, and kinkiness across the entire population). The overall effect is such that, despite relatively fewer actual hair shafts compared to straight hair, this texture appears (and feels) denser than its straight counterparts. The effect may be referred to as "thick", "bushy", or "woolly", and has at times been criticized for appearing "unpolished", "unkempt" or "unprofessional". In the 2010s, there was a resurgence in choosing the natural look among Black African Americans.

== See also ==
- Eponymous hairstyle
- Hairstyles in the 1950s
- Hairstyles in the 1980s
- Hairstyles of Japanese women
- List of facial hairstyles
- Nihongami
