= Asymmetric cut =

Haircut

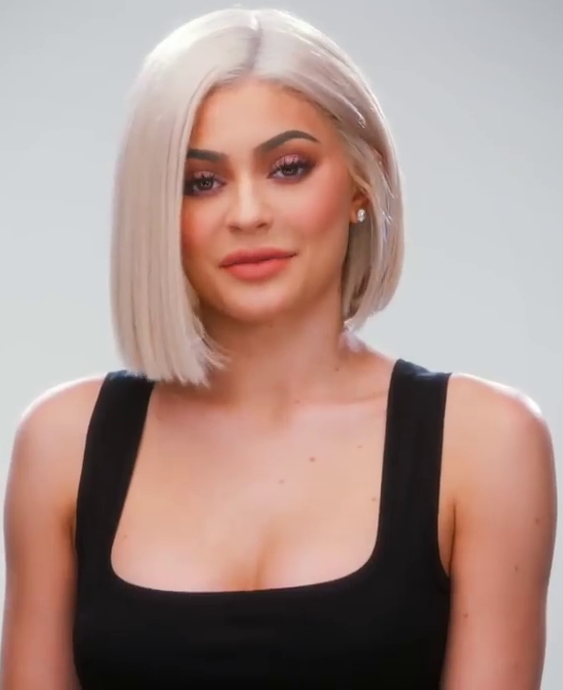
Kylie Jenner with an asymmetric bob haircut

An asymmetric cut is a haircut in which the hair is cut in such a way that the hair does not have left-right symmetry and one side is cut or appears to be longer than the other. It is a versatile hairstyle with many subvariations. Usually it is a combination of two separate styles, one for each side.

A woman with a side shave

An extreme variation is the side shave, in which one side of the head is totally or partially shaved close.

== Examples ==
Celebrities who have sported asymmetric hairstyles include Justin Bieber, January Jones, Milla Jovovich, Kim Kardashian, Cyndi Lauper, Rihanna, Sonny Moore, Roland Orzabal, Phil Oakey, Avril Lavigne, Demi Lovato, Kelly Clarkson, and Davey Havok of AFI. Reality television star Kate Gosselin became well known for her asymmetrical cut, which she has since changed. In video games, Tamaki from the Dead or Alive series features an asymmetric cut.

== Aesthetics ==
Asymmetric cuts can confer an aesthetic property known to professional hairdressers and cosmetologists as "asymmetrical balance" when they balance asymmetrical facial features. Hairdressers advise the use of an asymmetric cut for clients with asymmetrical features, such as a crooked nose, because symmetrical hairstyles draw attention to facial asymmetries. Experts on personal appearance management in business offer the same advice. The asymmetry of the hairstyle should be opposite to that of the facial feature. Asymmetrical styles that show the ears can make the face look slimmer, and hence are advised for clients with round faces or wide-set eyes. If the client wears eyeglasses, an asymmetric cut can distract attention from them. Asymmetric cuts are often more "trendy" than symmetrical hairstyles.

== Psychology ==
Psychological experiments have shown that hairstyle asymmetries are helpful, although not necessary, in determining whether or not an image of a familiar face has been mirror-reversed.

== See also ==
- List of hairstyles
