= Rattail (hairstyle) =

Tail-like hair style

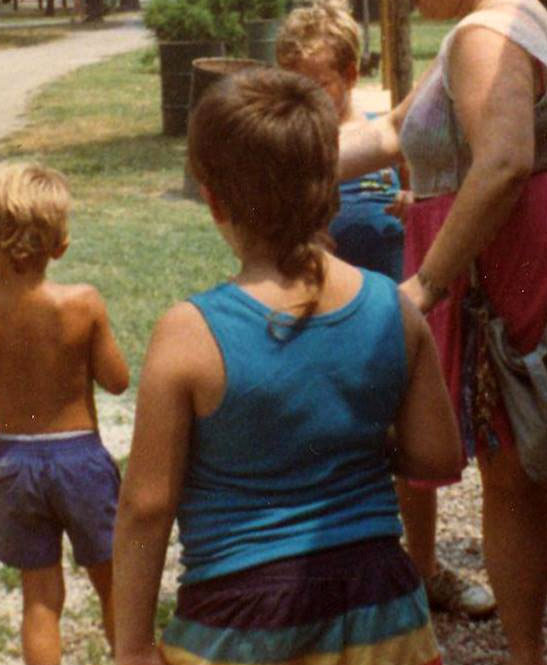
Child in the 1980s with a rattail

A rattail is a hairstyle that is characterized by a long "tail"-like element of hair growing downward from the back of the head. The rattail usually hangs naturally; however, it can be braided, treated as a dread, permed, straightened, poofed, or curled with an iron. In some instances, an individual might choose to grow several tails as opposed to a single very long tail. A rattail is characterised by hair longer than the rest of the hair surrounding it.

The rattail was briefly popular during the mid-to-late 1980s. By the mid-1990s, it had rapidly fallen out of fashion. It appeared again in 2015.

== Cultural prevalence ==
The rattail can be traced back to China during the 17th century when the Manchu took over and established the Qing Dynasty. It was known as the Manchu queue. In the 1980s, Vietnamese refugees fled to Australia and the United States. The Vietnamese youths were known to have rattails and popularized them throughout Western culture. Polynesians also have a variant of the rattail called the "horsey" or the "horsetail". They are usually thicker and more popular today within Australian/New Zealand youths. The rattail is usually associated with Asian youths, while the horsetail is more associated with Polynesian youths.

Some punks and rivetheads have been known to sport rattails, although in a much more punk fashion, sometimes with the tail dyed a different color than the rest of the hair or by shaving the rest of the head, leaving only the tail. It is a very popular hairstyle in Broome, Western Australia, and New Zealand, especially among boys, and is sometimes combined with shaved sides as a soft fauxhawk.

New Kids On The Block performer Jordan Knight wore a long braided rattail for much of his time with the band, which helped further the style's popularity.

Rush (band) former drummer Neil Peart wore a long braided rattail during Grace Under Pressure Tour (album) on 1984

Tears for Fears vocalist and bassist Curt Smith wore a multiple braided rattail during The Hurting era and changed to single braided tail on 1984 until he changed to pony tail on Everybody Wants to Rule the World era

Former junior welterweight boxing champion Kostya Tszyu wore a rattail throughout his career. and soccer player Rodrigo Palacio has a rattail.

Game developer Richard Garriott has worn a rattail since 1984.

In the Star Wars universe, Jedi Padawans wear a rattail called a Padawan Braid until they are given the rank of Jedi Knight.

In the HBO series The Idol, the character Tedros, played by the Weeknd, sports a prominent rattail.

== See also ==
- List of hairstyles
- Mullet
- Pigtail
- Ponytail
- Queue
- Shikha
