= Hair highlighting =

Hairstyles where some parts of the hair are lighter than the rest

Hair highlighting/lowlighting is the practice of changing a person's hair color, using lightener or haircolor to lift the level or brightness of hair strands. Hair dyes primarily come in two different forms: oxidative (permanent) and non-oxidative (semi-permanent and temporary). Permanent hair dyes bleach and add a new color to hair through the penetration of smaller dye precursors into the cortex and subsequent oxidation. There are four basic types of highlights: foil highlights, hair painting, frosting, and chunking. Highlights can be any color, as long as it is a lighter level than the surrounding hair. Hair lightened with bleach or permanent color will be permanent until new growth begins to show. Highlighted hair can make the hair appear fuller. Therefore, it is sometimes recommended for people with thin and fine hair.

== Basic foil highlighting ==
Foil highlighting is the process of using foil to some strands of hair which will be lightened from particular sections of hair which will remain its natural color. The process is done by applying lightener to the hair that has been woven and separated using an applicator brush. The foil is then folded to protect the hair and surrounding area during the processing time, which is the amount of time required to achieve the desired results. In highlighting hair, hydrogen peroxide mixed with pigment is used to change the color of the strand.

This process is also used in applying lowlights to the hair; dyes are used to create strands of hair that are darker than the natural color.

== Hair painting ==
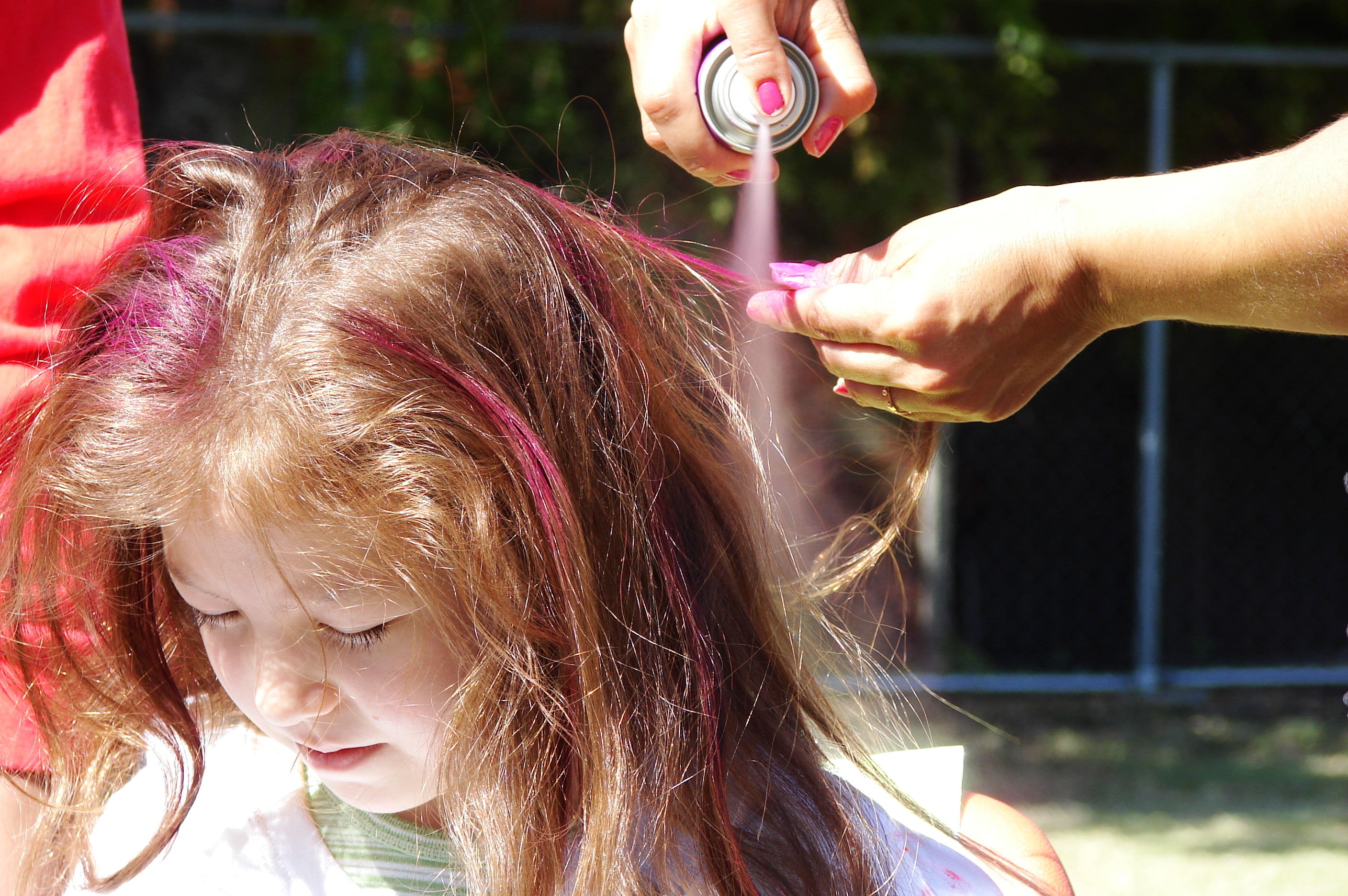
Coloring a young girl's hair with temporary spray paint

Hair painting is a method of highlighting hair that uses free-handed technique to achieve a highlighted effect. Hair painting methods are permanent and employ a hair-painting brush. Foils, plastic wrap, paper, or cotton may be used to separate lightened hair from non-lightened hair. While brushes are commonly used in hair painting, one may also use combs to paint or highlight thin-sized strands of hair.

- Balayage (from the French, meaning 'scanning, sweeping') is a technique of free-form painting on clean, styled hair. The results are subtle, and thus more natural-looking than foiling or chunking.
- Leopard hair highlights, or leopard hair print, are hair highlights with a pattern resembling the spotted coat of a leopard.These spots are created by first bleaching in spots, and then using brown dye to color the outer parts of the bleached spots. It is also common to use fashion colors for this effect. This type of hair process started as a trend in urban street fashion and is often combined with eccentric haircuts. It is possible to apply a leopard hair print both on long or short hair. Another similar motif used is the cheetah hair pattern.

== Frosting ==
Frosting is a process of lightening strands of hair while leaving the adjacent hairs untreated. A highlighting cap may be used with this technique. Hair is pulled through holes in the cap and that hair is then lightened. The effects of this can give the hair a look that is "salt and pepper" with a decent amount of hair left untreated. It creates a stark contrast between the colors and usually does not resemble natural highlights. This is a popular technique for those with shorter hair.

== Chunking ==
Chunking is a style of highlight which is larger and thicker than a traditional highlight, rather than a method of creating highlights. Chunky highlights are generally offered in a wider variety of bold natural colors, as well as a large number of artificial, or unnatural, colors and are used to create more contrast, rather than subtle texture, as in traditional, thinner highlights.

== Maintaining Health of Highlighted Hair ==
To support the health of highlighted hair and aid in recovery from damage, it is beneficial to use hair care products that help manage the hair cuticle and restore moisture. Applying an acidic pH solution, such as an acidic hair care product, immediately after dyeing can help reduce the permeability of the hair cuticle and accelerate the recovery of mild damage. Additionally, using hair care products that contain cationic surfactants (e.g., stearalkonium chloride) and conditioning agents (e.g., proteins) can further enhance the restoration process during and after the dyeing period.

== See also ==
- List of hairstyles
