= Liberty spikes =

Variant of spiky hair where the head hair is styled into long, thick, upright spikes

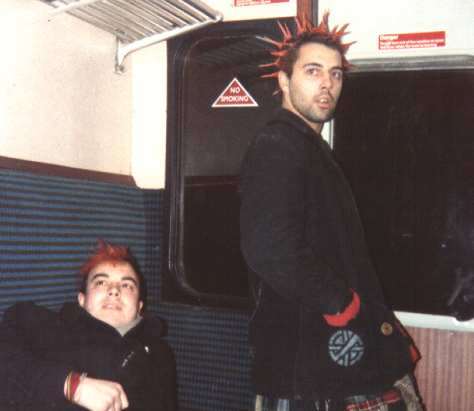
A British punk with liberty spikes in 1986

Liberty spikes is hair styled into long, thick, upright spikes. The style, now associated with the punk subculture, is so named because of the resemblance to the diadem crown worn by the Statue of Liberty (Liberty Enlightening the World), itself inspired by the Roman goddess Libertas and god Sol Invictus.

== History ==
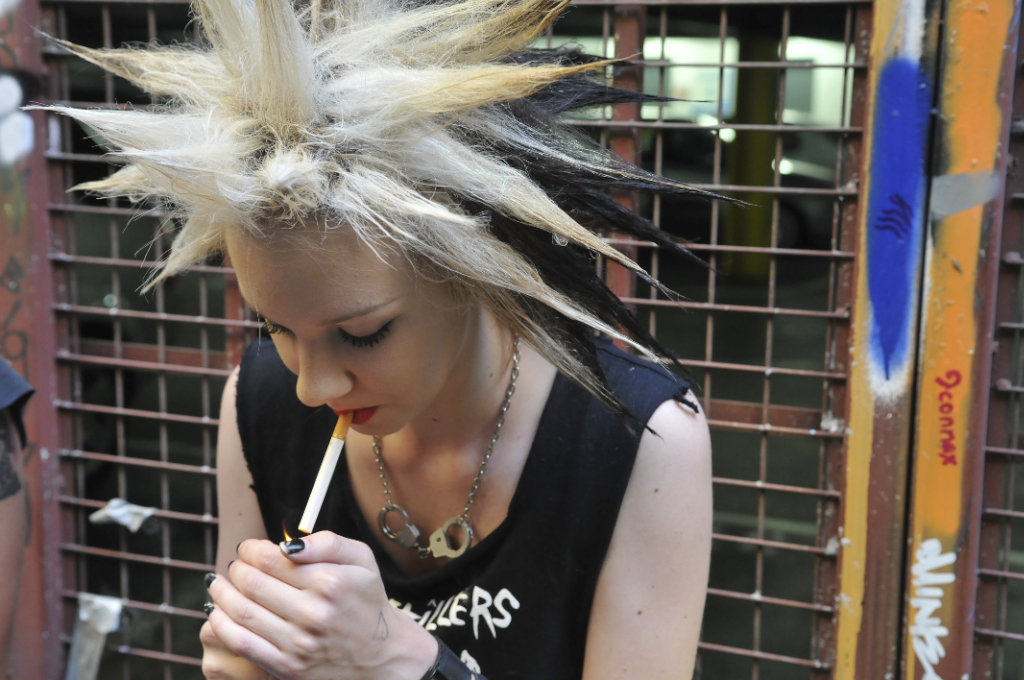
A female punk wearing liberty spikes in 2007

Liberty spikes trace their origins to the Ancient Britons. Warriors washed their long hair in lime water, which also bleached it blond. This hairstyle was highly symbolic as a badge of honor and manhood: Celts were not allowed to spike or cut their hair until they had killed an enemy. After the subjugation of Britain spiked hair fell out of use in favor of short Roman haircuts. In the silent film era some actors, like comedian Harold Lloyd, experimented with spiked hair to stand out from the crowd, although this trend did not catch on with ordinary people. This changed in the 1970s when the emerging British punk subculture chose messy, choppy hair in reaction to the long smooth styles worn by hippies and disco fans. Originally the spikes were small, as worn by modern-day pop-punk fans, but by the 1980s this had evolved to tall liberty spikes, sometimes over a foot in length. Liberty spikes were also worn by the Goth subculture, although in this case they were dyed black instead of the bright unnatural colors favored by punk rockers. They are often kept in for days or weeks at a time.

There are also liberty spikes that make use solely of front spikes to look more like the crown of the Statue of Liberty than a proper mohawk. This type of styling is not easy by any means. Those who do it, spend anywhere from one to two hours, and they are somewhat uncomfortable to sleep with. This form of liberty spikes is also known as a crown.

== Maintenance ==
In this style, the hair is formed into thick spikes that may radiate outwards in all directions or all point up in the same direction. They are favored for their durability in extremely long hair. Liberty spikes may be enhanced by the use of hair dyes.

Liberty spikes are also a common way of styling mohawks.

Forming and keeping the shape of liberty spikes is beyond the capacity of some hair styling products, which were created for more natural looking styles.

== In popular culture ==
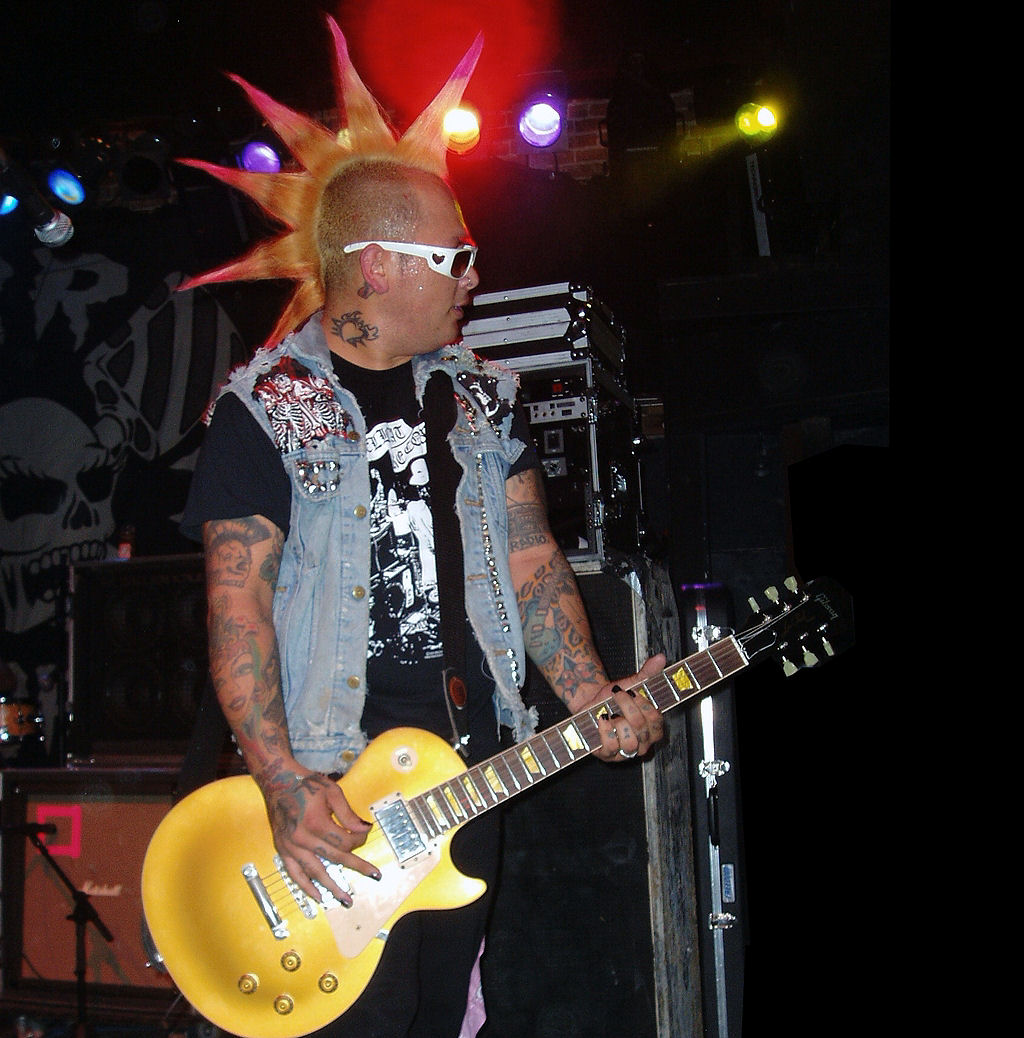
Left Alone vocalist Elvis Cortez with a liberty spike mohawk

- Salvador Dalí in the 1950s made a spiky hairstyle for a model.
- GBH, 1980s–present.
- Benji Madden from American pop punk group Good Charlotte.
- Tech N9ne was known for his red liberty spikes in the early 2000s.
- Jimmy Urine was known to sport the liberty spikes in the early 2000s for the band Mindless Self Indulgence.
- Brody Dalle was known to have liberty spikes during her time in the band The Distillers.
- Mikhail Gorsheniov in the late 2000s.
- The character of June Tuesday in That '80s Show.
- Professional wrestler Nigel McGuinness was known for his liberty spikes look during his time in the wrestling promotion Ring of Honor.
- American rapper Lil Uzi Vert in the 2020s

== See also ==
- List of hairstyles
