= Layered hair =

Hair-styling technique

Layered hair is a hairstyle that gives the illusion of length and volume at the same time, using long hair (in the back) for the illusion of length, and short hair (in the front) for volume, as an easy style to manage. Hair is arranged into layers, with the top layers (those that grow nearer the crown) cut shorter than the layers beneath. This allows the tips of the top layers to blend like a tornado with layers beneath.

Popular modern hairstyles involve creating unique styles between the different layers. There can be distinct layering with obvious layers, or blended layering with soft layers. Hair color can also amplify the layering effect that layers give in a certain hair style.

== Techniques ==
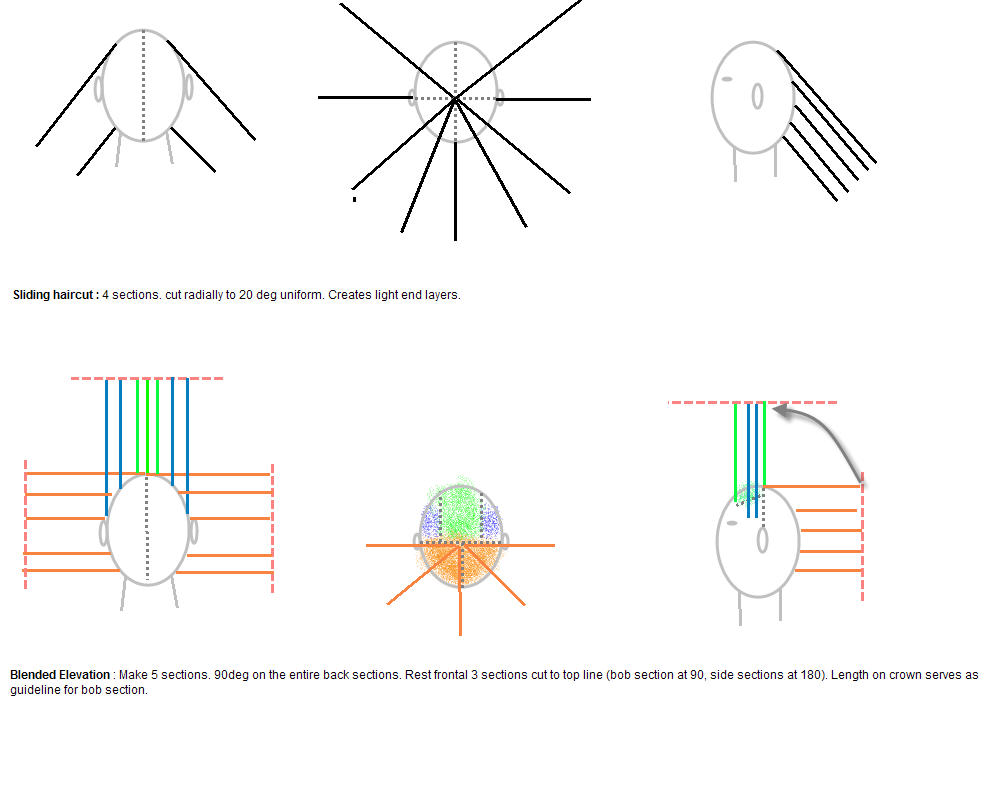
Sectioning and angles

The layered hair effect is achieved by taking sections of hair vertically across the head, pulling it perpendicular to the head, and cutting straight across.

Sliding haircut: The hair is sectioned in 4 parts, starting with back section and cut radially at 20 deg angle. The transition over the ear is used as a guideline for the front sections. This creates a soft layered end, but predominantly gives the one-length look. Suitable for medium wavy textures.

Blended Elevation: The top section (bob section) is cut at 90 degrees while the side sections are cut 180 deg to the length of the top section. The occipital and nape sections are cut at 90 deg. In this form of layering there is an "elevated" group of layers formed due to shorter top section and then it blends with the softer side and back layers. It is not considered suitable for wavy or curly hair, but for straight or slightly wavy hair.

== See also ==
- Feathered hair
- List of hairstyles
