= Garren =

American hairstylist

- Born: Gary Joseph DeFazio; 1949 (age 76–77); Niagara Falls, New York
- Occupation: Hairstylist
- Years active: 1965–present
- Partner: Thom Priano (1975–present)

Garren is an American hairstylist. He has worked in the fashion industry since the 1970s.

== Early life ==
Garren was born in Niagara Falls, New York, in 1949. As a teenager, he became interested in fashion and hair after being exposed to Vogue and Harper's Bazaar. He began his career working out of his parents' basement doing the hair of his mother's friends. His guidance counselor at La Salle High School opposed his decision to be a hairdresser, but his family supported him. At age 16, he attended night school and then worked for his brother's salon.

== Career ==
Garren moved to New York City in 1975 where he worked in the hair salon at Bergdorf Goodman. He received his big break when he was offered a chance to style Christie Brinkley's hair for a Vogue shoot. He also recut and straightened Farrah Fawcett's hair from its famous feathered look, and styled Brooke Shields in her 1981 Calvin Klein ads. In 1982, Garren moved to the Glemby Salon in the Plaza Hotel where he was responsible for creating Madonna's Marilyn Monroe-inspired hairstyle. In the early 1990s, he began to work extensively with Anna Sui, styling her runway shows. In 1991, he opened up his own salon, Garren New York, in Manhattan. He cut Kristen McMenamy's long red hair short, which he then dyed black. He gave a pixie haircut to Lucie de la Falaise in 1992, and a mod-inspired bob to Linda Evangelista in 1995. In 1998, he styled Erin O'Connor for Vogue and convinced her to cut her hair short and dye it a darker color. He also styled Audrey Hepburn for Vanity Fair, Karen Elson, Oprah and Gisele Bündchen. In 2012, he provided Karlie Kloss with her now-signature Karlie bob. In January 2015, Garren closed his Fifth Avenue salon, but still styles select customers privately.

== Influences ==
Garren cites his major influences as Mr. Kenneth, Vidal Sassoon and Alexandre de Paris.
