= Shag (haircut) =

Hairstyle

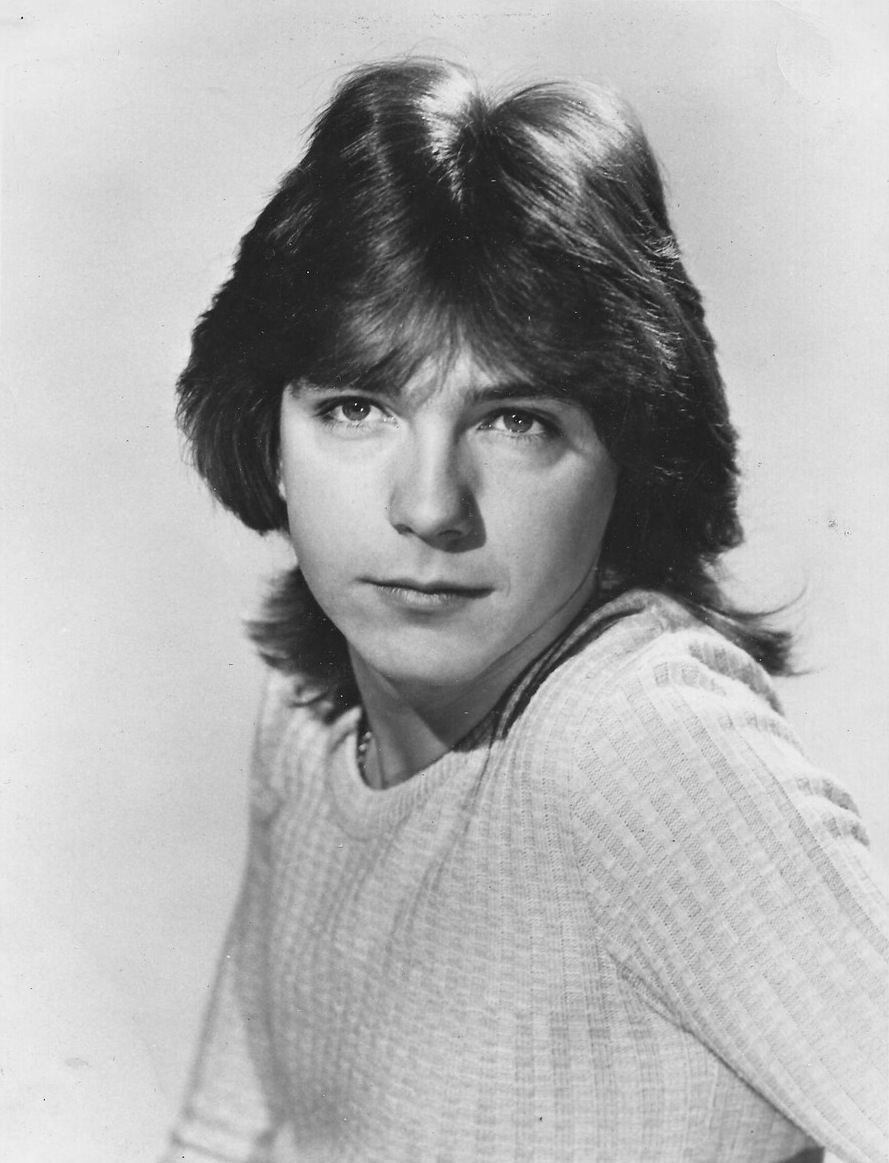
American actor David Cassidy in 1972

A shag cut is a hairstyle that has been layered to various lengths. It is usually attributed to the New York hairstylist Paul McGregor, who gave it to Jane Fonda c. 1969, leading to its rise to fame in the 1971 movie Klute, although a hairstyle called "shag" has existed since at least 1956. McGregor originally called his cut "the Funky".

The layers of a shag cut are often feathered at the top and sides. The layers make the hair full around the crown, and the hair thins to fringes around the edges. This unisex style became popular after being worn by various celebrities, including, besides Fonda, Joan Jett, David Bowie, Mick Jagger, Rod Stewart, David Cassidy, Stevie Nicks and Florence Henderson in the early 1970s. During the 1990s, Jennifer Aniston popularized "The Rachel" hairstyle, and Meg Ryan wore a shag in the early 2000s. The haircut had a resurgence in popularity during the early 2020s.

In the 2020s, a variation of the shag called a wolf cut became popular. This variation differentiates itself by being shorter at the front in a style reminiscent of the mullet and often includes bangs. The wolf cut has been worn by celebrities including Billie Eilish, Camila Cabello and Miley Cyrus.

== See also ==
- List of hairstyles
