= Feathered hair =

Hairstyle

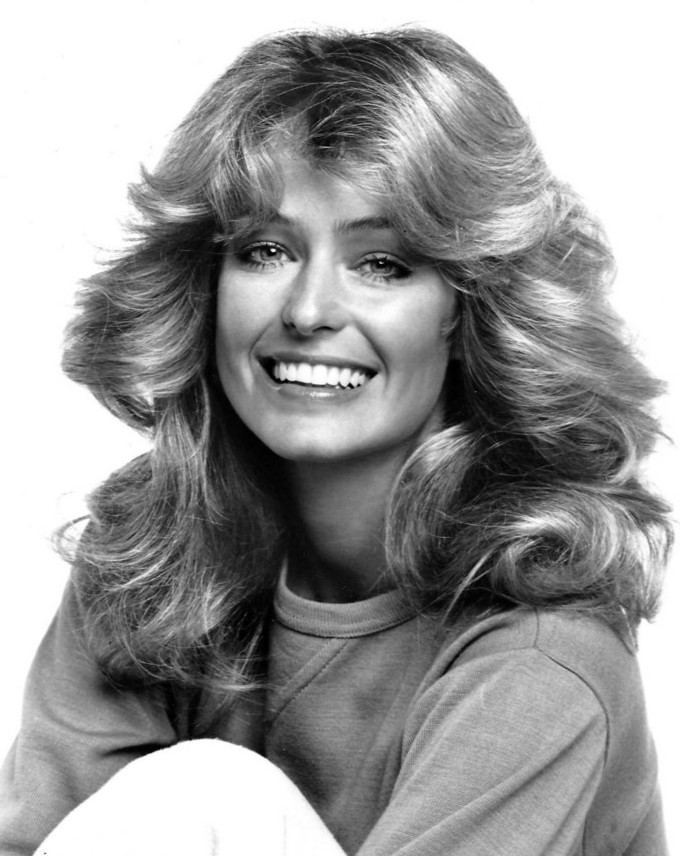
Farrah Fawcett as Jill Munroe

Feathered hair is a hairstyling technique that was popular in the 1970s and the early 1980s. It was designed for straight hair. The hair was layered, with either a side or a center parting. The hair would be brushed back at the sides, giving an appearance similar to the feathers of a bird.

The haircut gained phenomenal popularity in the early 1970s. Many celebrities wore this style at some time or another including Farrah Fawcett, Jeff Conaway, Dorothy Hamill, Diana, Princess of Wales, John Travolta and Rob Lowe.

== See also ==
- Feather hair extensions
- List of hairstyles
