= Quiff =

Hairstyle

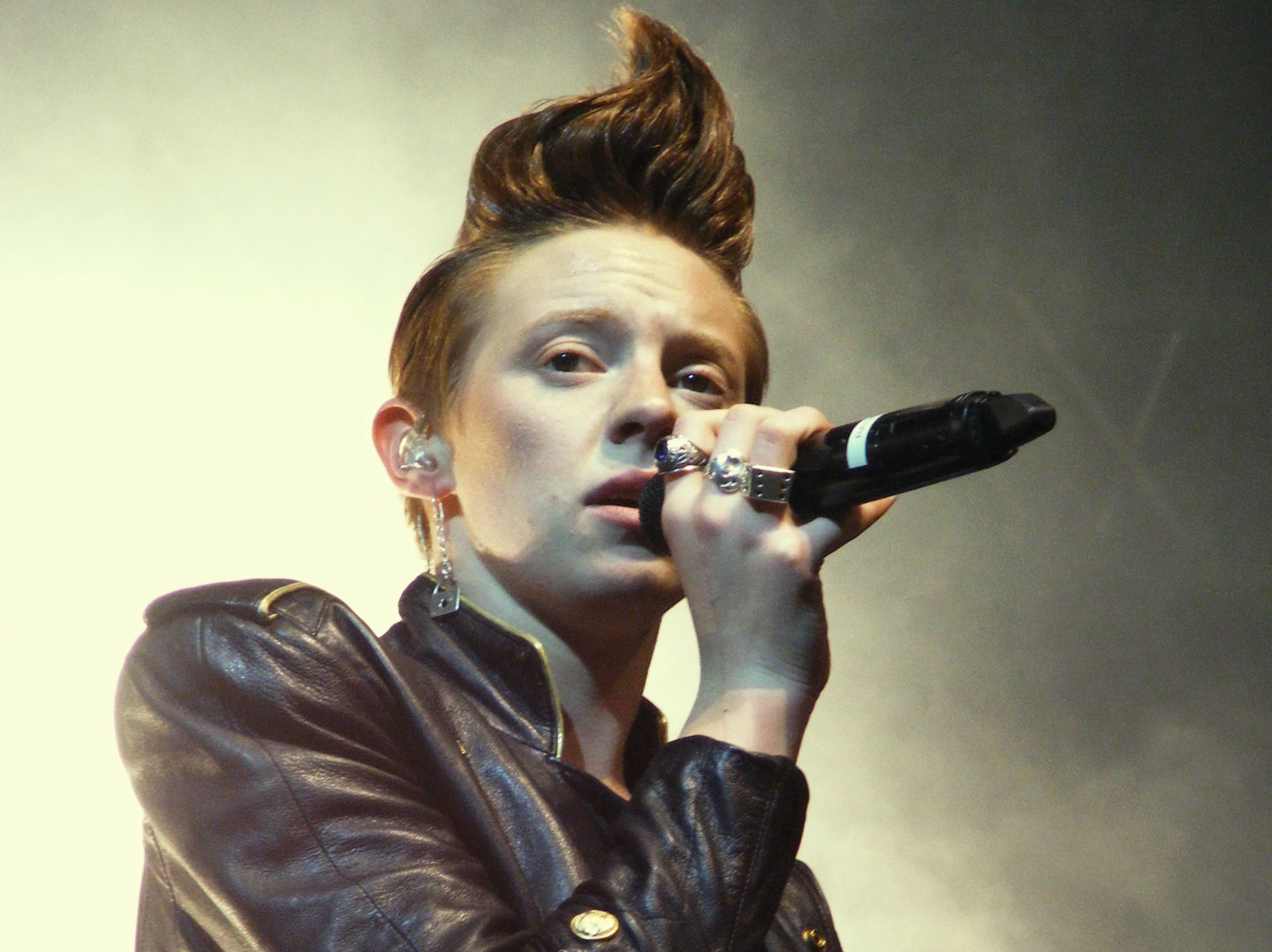
Elly Jackson of La Roux wearing her hair in a quiff

The quiff is a hairstyle that combines the 1950s pompadour hairstyle, the 1950s flattop, and sometimes a mohawk. It was born as a post-war reaction to the short and strict haircuts for men. The hairstyle was a staple in the British Teddy Boy movement, but became popular again in Europe in the early 1980s and experienced a resurgence in popularity during the 1990s.

== Origin ==
The etymology of the word "quiff" is uncertain, several proposals have been suggested for its origin. It may owe its origin to the French word coiffe, which can mean either a hairstyle (coiffure) or, going further back, the mail coif that knights wore over their heads and under their helmets. Another possible candidate for its origin is the Dutch word kuif, meaning "crest". The Dutch name for Tintin, who sports a quiff, is Kuifje, which is the diminutive of the same word.

== Styles ==
The modern-day quiff includes longer hair at the front of the head, receding into shorter hair at the back with a trimmed back and sides. The Japanese Regent hairstyle, a favorite among yakuza (organized criminals) and bōsōzoku (biker gangs), is similar to the quiff.

== See also ==
- Fauxhawk
- List of hairstyles
