= Hairstyles in the 1950s =

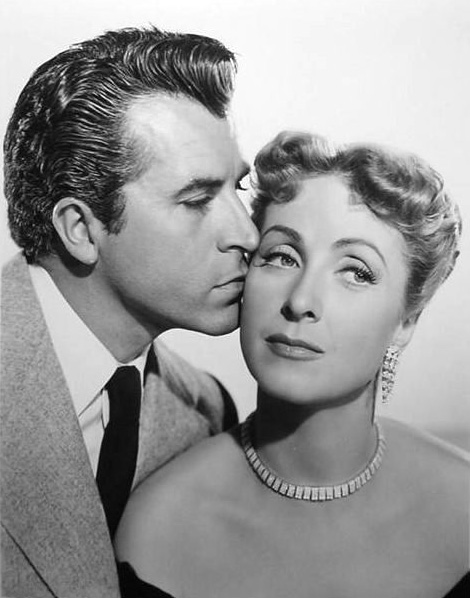
Typical hairstyles of the early 50s shown here on Fernando Lamas and Danielle Darrieux

In the Western world, the 1950s were a decade known for experimentation with new styles and culture. Following World War II and the austerity years of the post-war period, the 1950s were a time of comparative prosperity, which influenced fashion and the concept of glamour. Hairstylists invented new hairstyles for wealthy patrons. Influential hairstylists of the period include Sydney Guilaroff, Alexandre of Paris and Raymond Bessone, who took French hair fashion to Hollywood, New York and London, popularising the pickle cut, the pixie cut and bouffant hairstyles.

The American film industry and the popular music industry influenced hairstyles around the world, both in mainstream fashion and teenage sub-culture. With the advent of the rock music industry, teenage culture and fashion became increasingly significant and distinctive from mainstream fashion, with American style being imitated in Europe, Asia, Australasia and South America. Teenage girls around the world wore their hair in ponytails while teenage boys wore crew cuts, the more rebellious among them favouring "greaser" comb-backs.

The development of hair-styling products, particularly setting sprays, hair-oil and hair-cream, influenced the way hair was styled and the way people around the world wore their hair day to day. Women's hairstyles of the 1950s were in general less ornate and more informal than those of the 1940s, with a "natural" look being favoured, even if it was achieved by perming, setting, styling and spraying. Mature men's hairstyles were always short and neat, and they were generally maintained with hair-oil. Even among "rebellious youth" with longer, greased hair, carrying a comb and maintaining the hairstyle was part of the culture.

== Male fashion ==
Popular music and film stars had a major influence on 1950s hairstyles and fashion. Elvis Presley and James Dean had a great influence on the high quiff-pompadour greased-up style or slicked-back style for men with heavy use of Brylcreem or pomade. The pompadour was a fashion trend in the 1950s, especially among male rockabilly artists and actors. A variation of this was the duck's ass (or in the UK "duck's arse"), also called the "duck's tail", the "ducktail", or simply the D.A.

The ducktail hairstyle was originally developed by Joe Cerello in 1940. Cerello's clients later included film celebrities like Elvis Presley and James Dean. Frank Sinatra posed in a modified D.A. style of hair. This style required that the hair be combed back around the sides of the head. The tooth edge of a comb was then used to define a central part running from the crown to the nape at the back of the head, resembling, to many, the rear end of a duck. The hair on the top front of the head was either deliberately disarrayed so that untidy strands hung down over the forehead, or combed up and then curled down into an "elephant's trunk" which might hang down as far as the top of the nose. The sides were styled to resemble the folded wings of the duck, often with heavy sideburns.

A variant of the duck's tail style, known as "the Detroit", consisted of the long back and sides combined with a flattop. In California, the top hair was allowed to grow longer and combed into a wavelike pompadour shape known as a "breaker". The duck's tail became an emblematic coiffure of disaffected young males across the English-speaking world during the 1950s, a sign of rebellious youth and of a "bad boy" image. The style was frowned upon by high school authorities, who often imposed limitations on male hair length as part of their dress codes. Nevertheless, the style was widely copied by men of all ages.

The regular haircut, side-parted with tapered back and sides, was considered a clean cut fashion and preferred by parents and school authorities in the United States. The crew cut, flattop and ivy league were also popular, particularly among high school and college students. The crew cut style was derived from the military haircuts given to millions of draftees, and was favored by men who wished to appear "establishment" or mainstream. Daily applications of "butch wax" were used to make the short hair stand straight up from the head. Celebrities favoring this style included Steve McQueen, Mickey Mantle and John Glenn. Crew cuts gradually declined in popularity by the end of the decade, as longer hair for men became fashionable.

Black male entertainers chose to wear their hair in short and unstraightened styles.

In southeast Asia, a variation of the quiff that was popular was the "curry puff", styled by a bob of wavy hair just above the forehead. "Geek chic" was a fashion trend for intellectual types, with a bouffant or greased-back hair and black glasses, exhibited by the likes of Buddy Holly and Bill Evans.

It originally it was frequent in beach areas, like Hawaii and California.

Side part

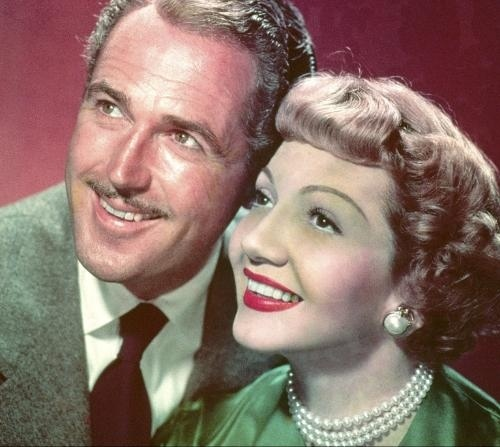
Patric Knowles with a conservative parted and combed-back hairstyle

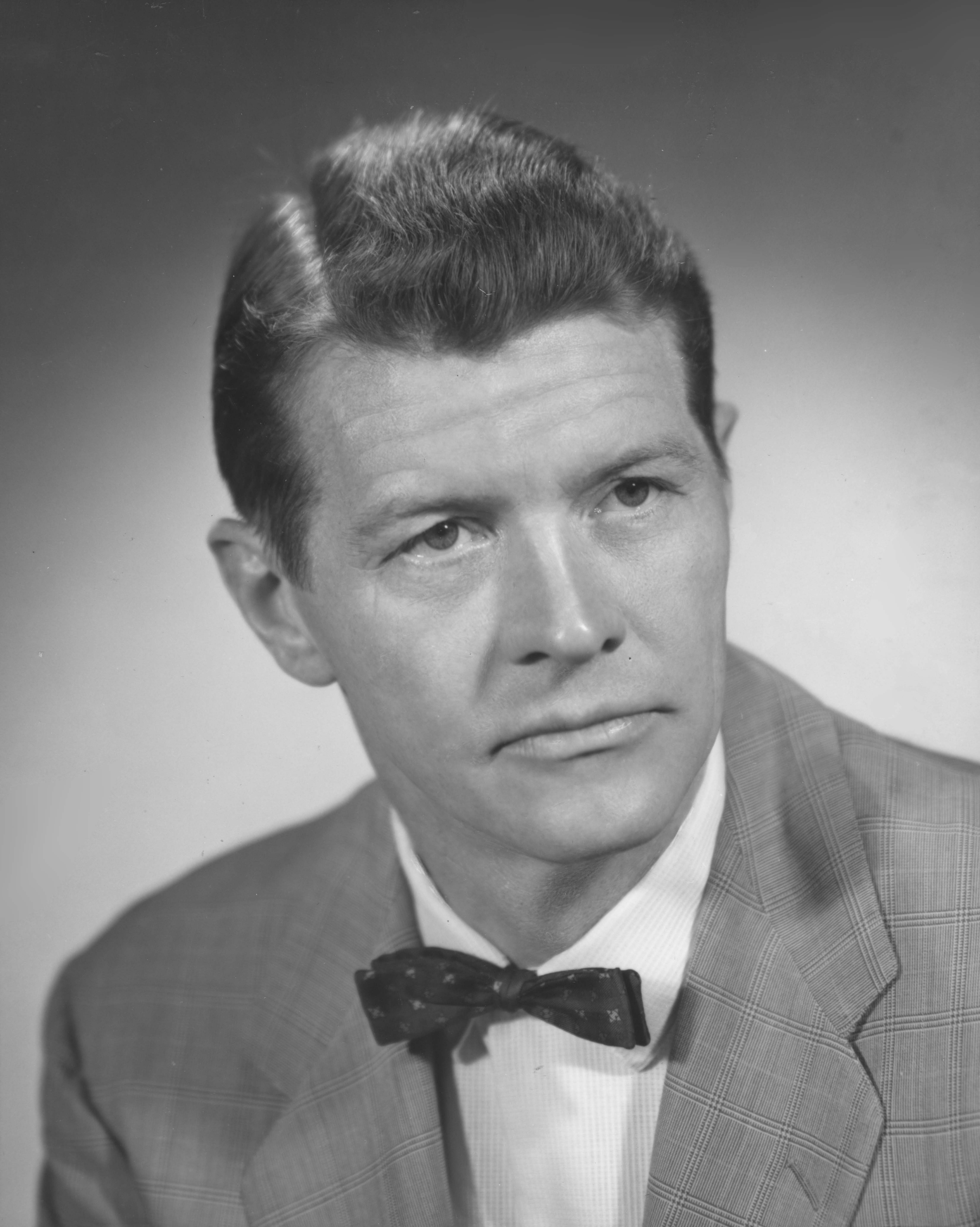
Christian B. Anfinsen, 1950s, with a regular haircut

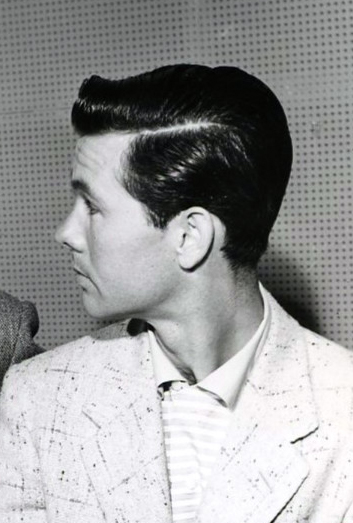
Johnny Carson, 1955, with a side part and quiff

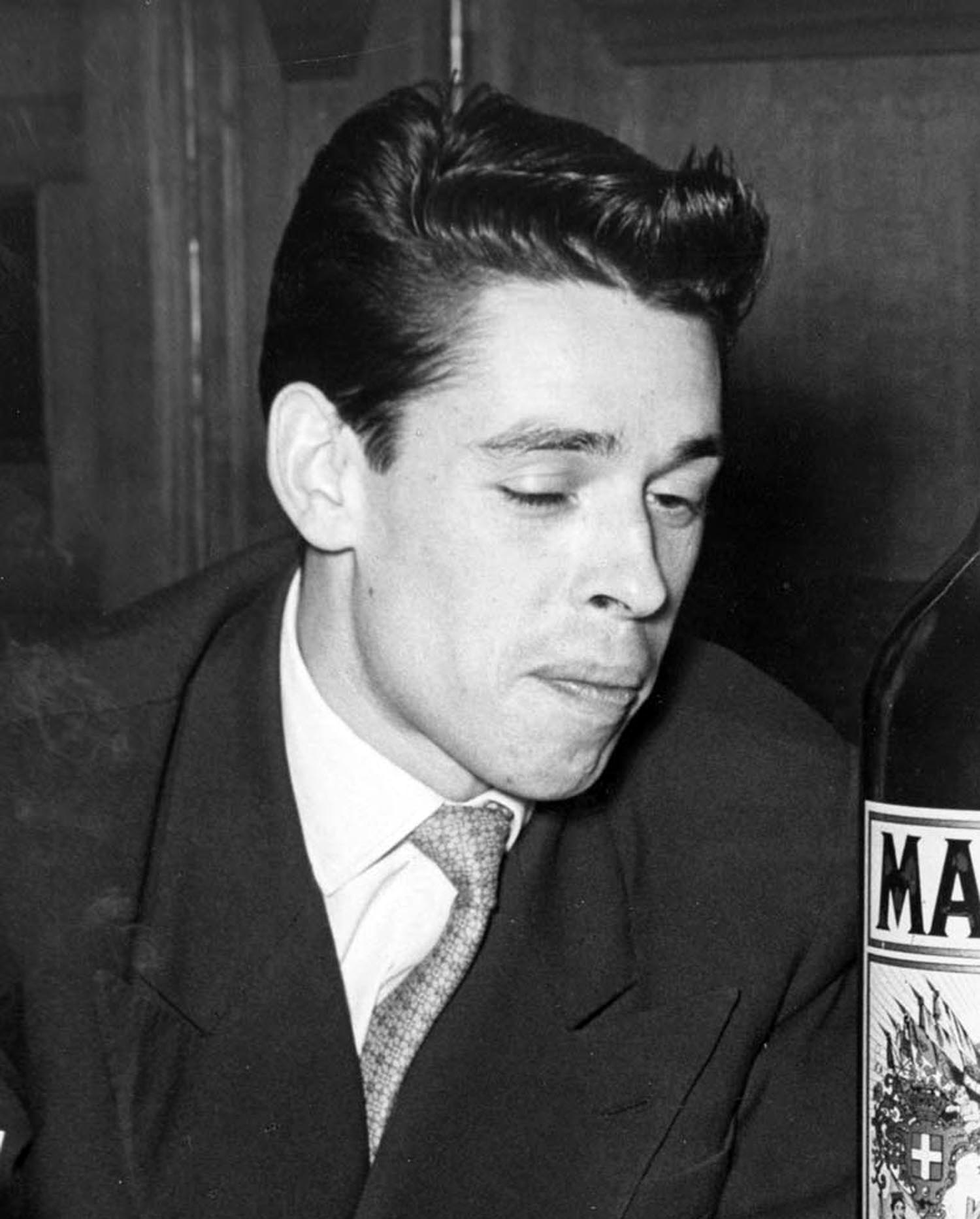
Jacques Brel, 1955, with a "breaker" and sideburns
Long pompadour

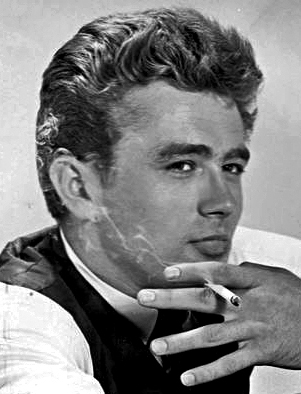
James Dean, 1955

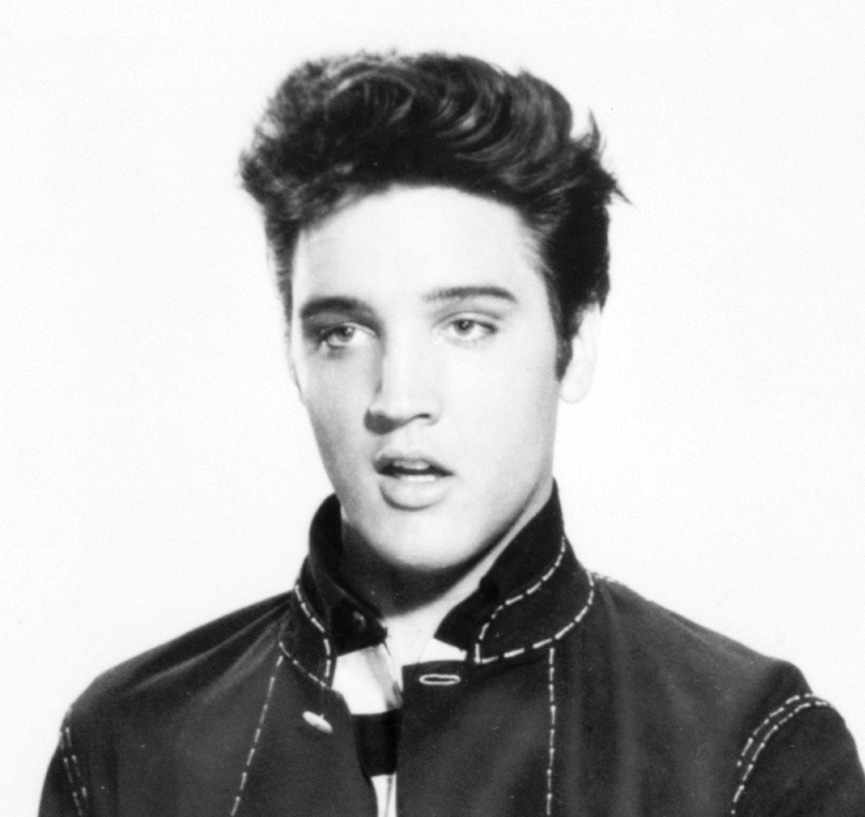
Elvis Presley, 1957

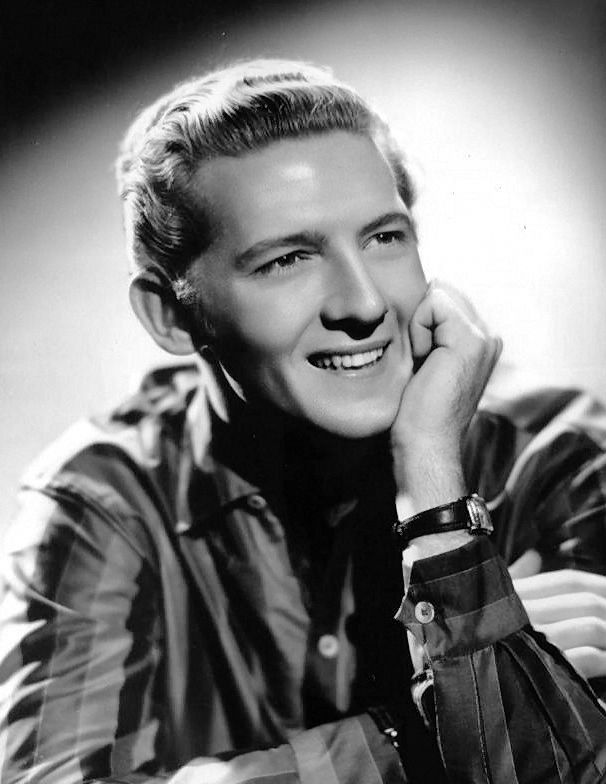
Jerry Lee Lewis, 1958

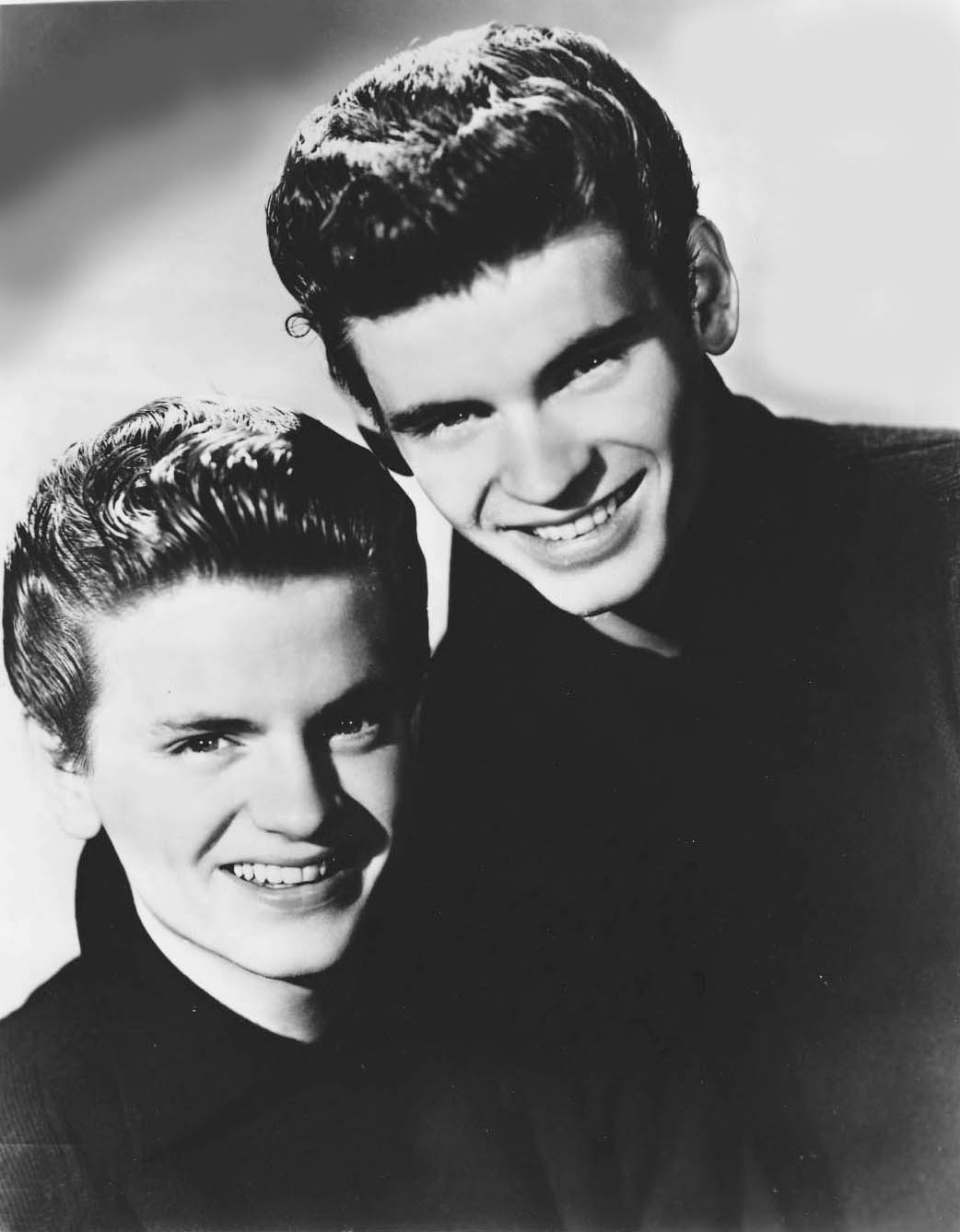
The Everly Brothers, Phil and Don, 1958
Crew cut and Ivy League

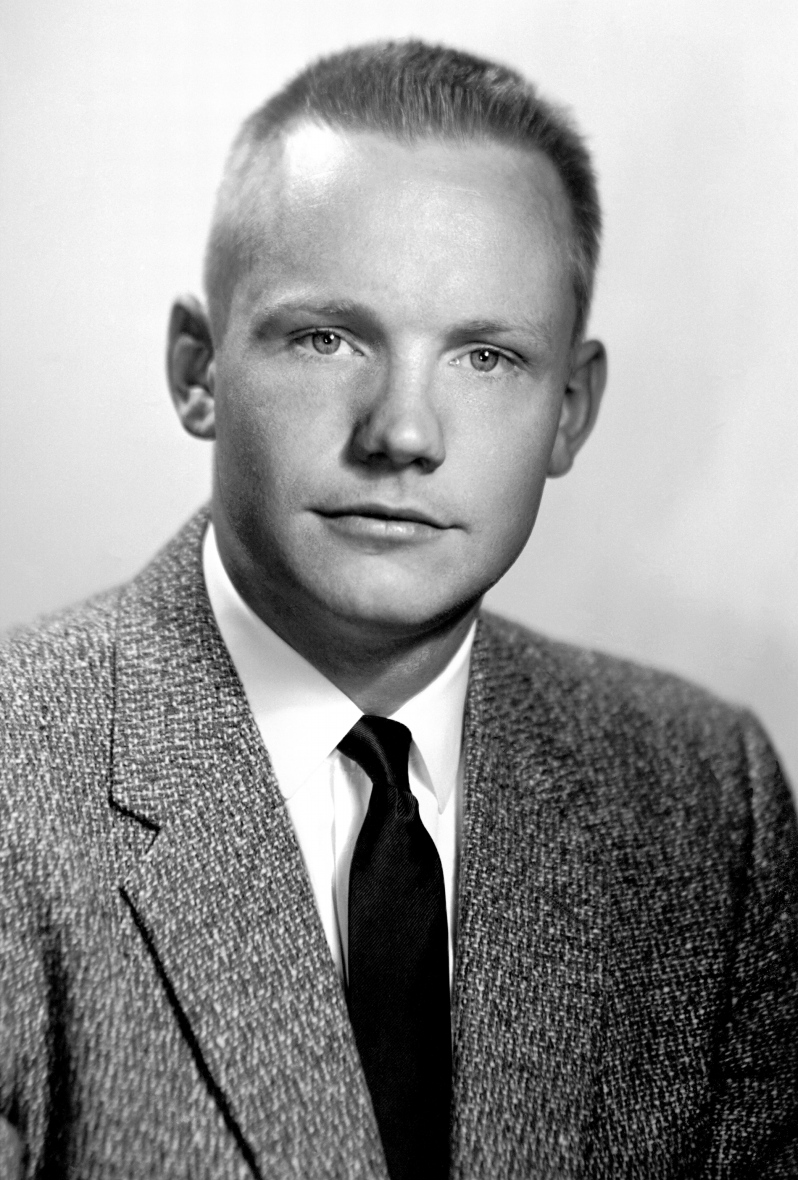
Neil Armstrong, 1956, with a crew cut

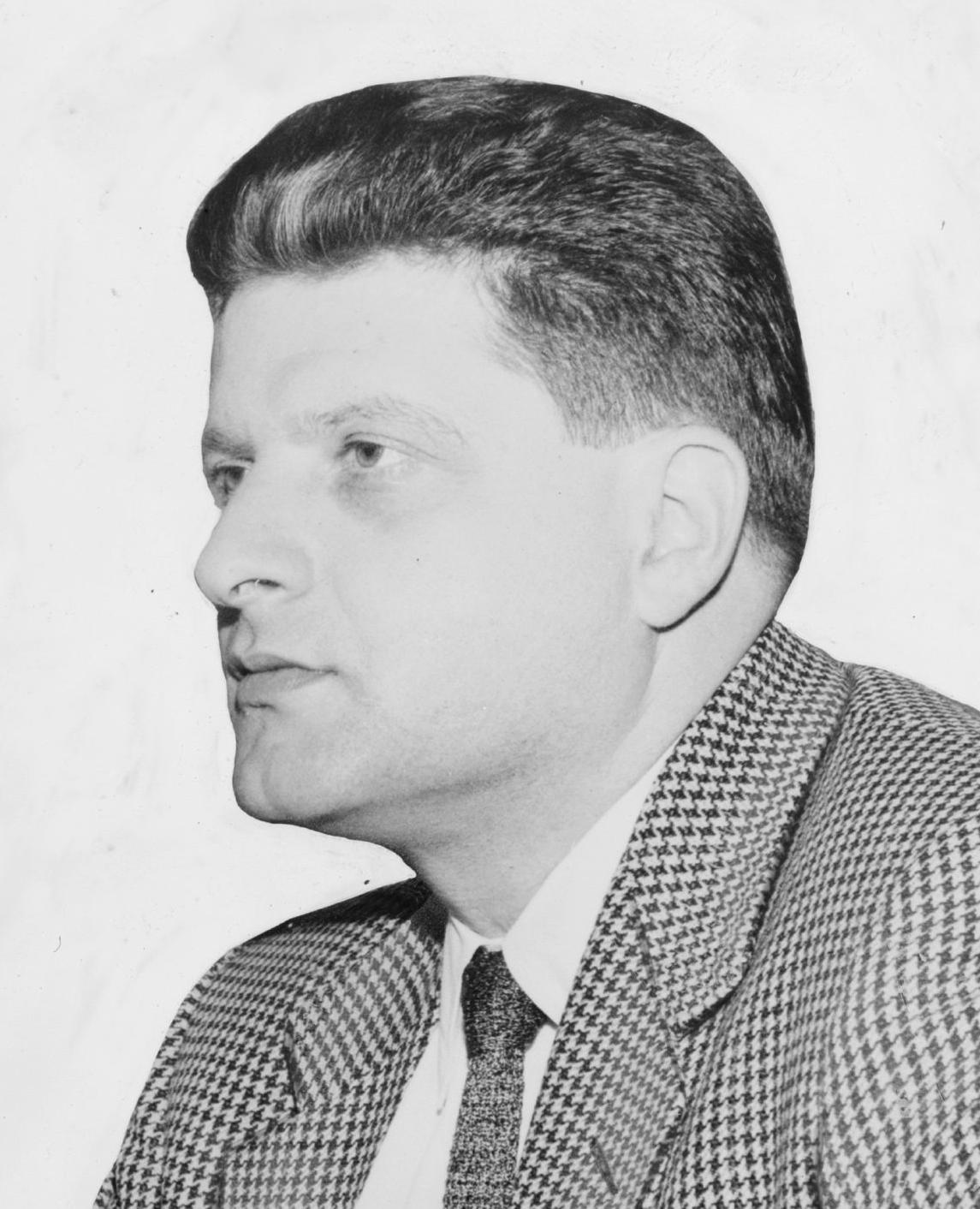
Paddy Chayefsky, 1950s, with an Ivy League

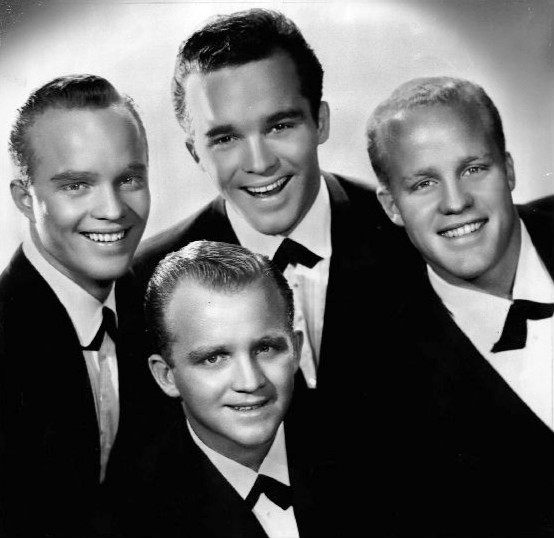
Gary, Lindsay, Philip and Dennis Crosby, 1959, with variations of the crew cut and ivy league

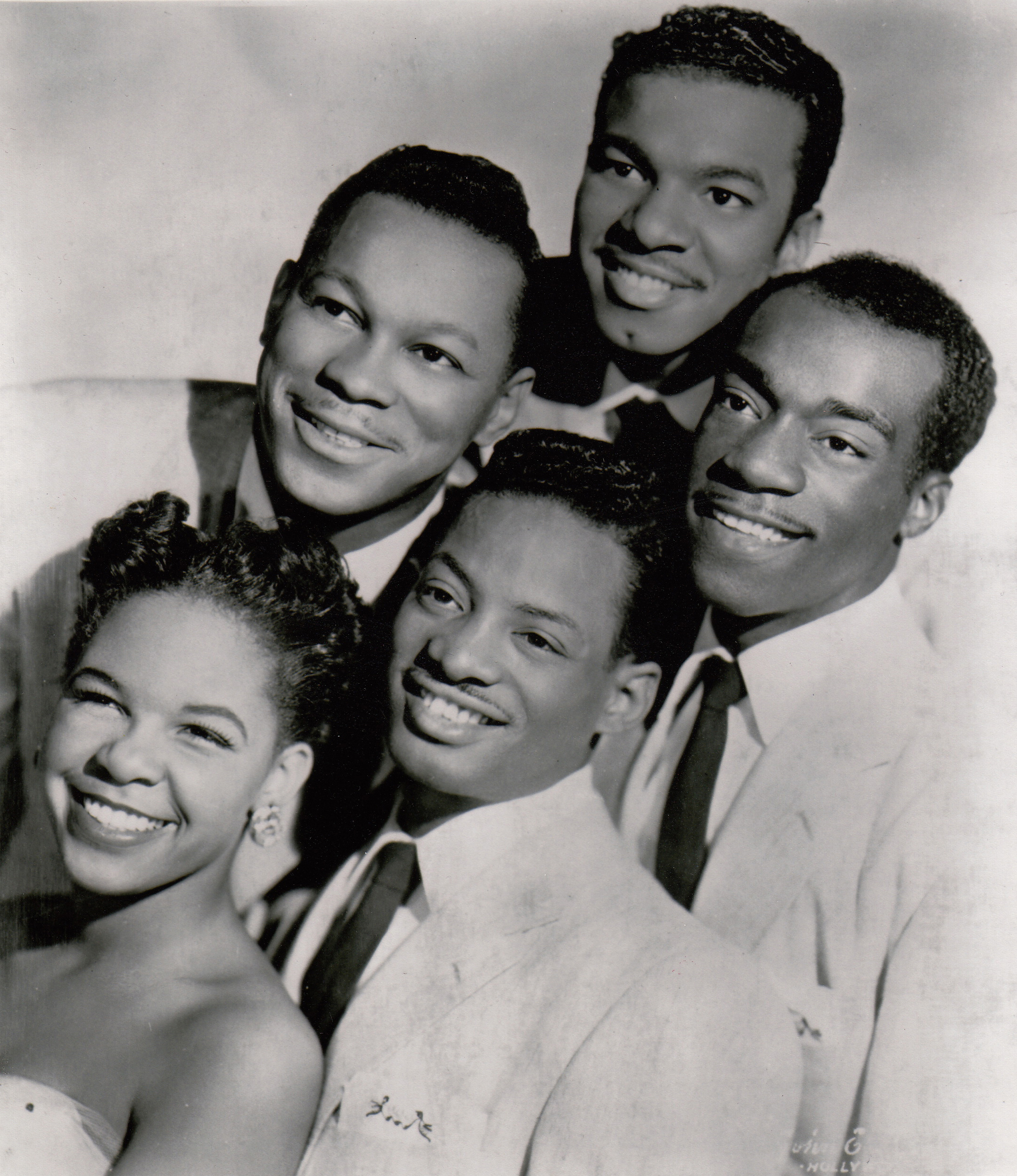
The Platters, 1950s, with variations of the crew cut and ivy league

== Female fashion ==
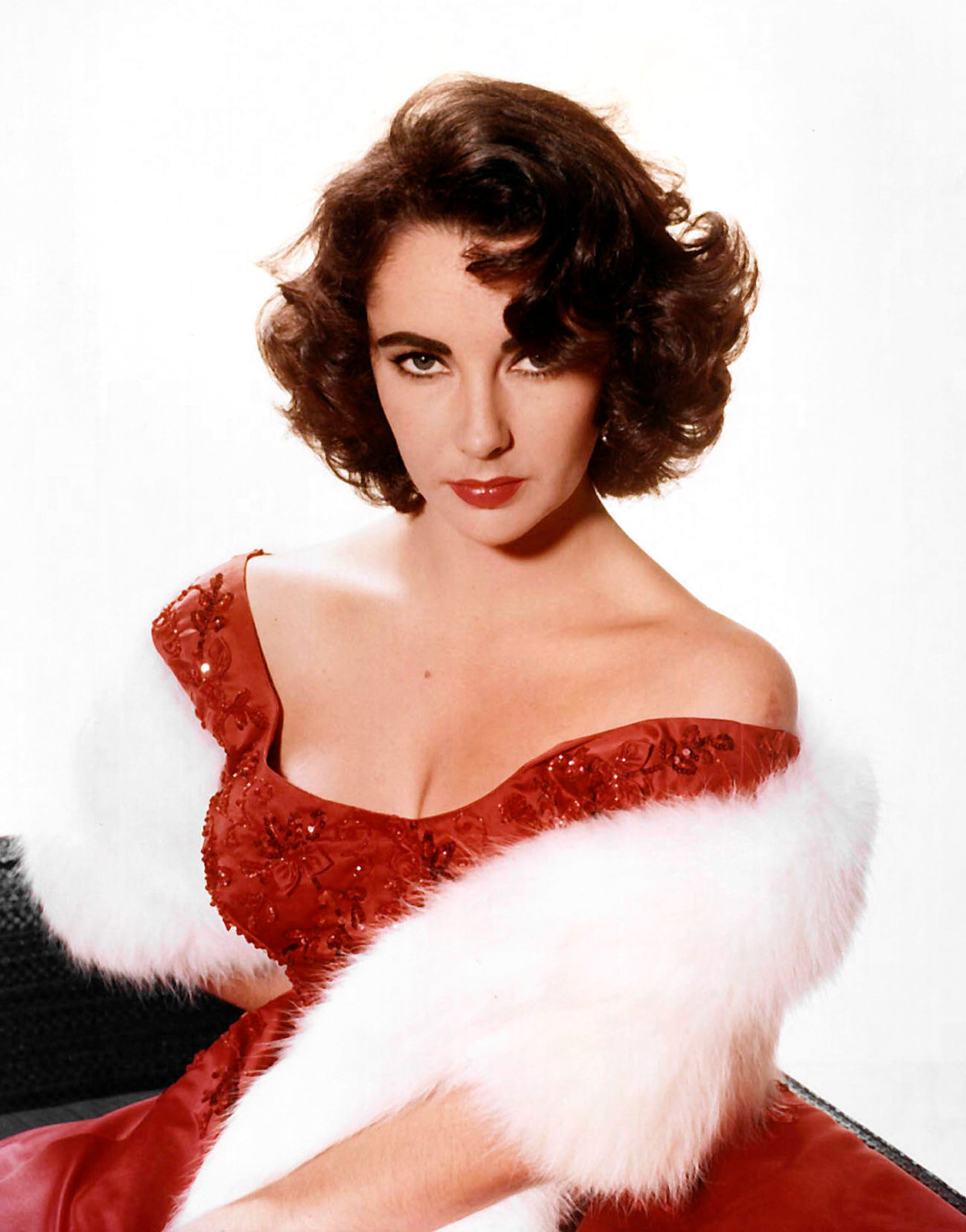
Elizabeth Taylor, c.1955

Women generally emulated the hair styles and hair colors of popular film personalities and fashion magazines; top models played a pivotal role in propagating the styles. Alexandre of Paris had developed the beehive and artichoke styles seen on Grace Kelly, Jackie Kennedy, the Duchess of Windsor, Elizabeth Taylor, and Tippi Hedren. Generally, a shorter bouffant style was favored by female movie stars, paving the way for the long hair trend of the 1960s. Very short cropped hairstyles were fashionable in the early 1950s. By mid-decade, hats were worn less frequently, especially as fuller hairstyles like the short, curly "elfin cut" or the "Italian cut" or "poodle cut" and later the bouffant and the beehive became fashionable (sometimes nicknamed B-52s for their similarity to the bulbous noses of the B-52 Stratofortress bomber). Stars such as Marilyn Monroe, Connie Francis, Elizabeth Taylor and Audrey Hepburn usually wore their hair short with high volume. In the poodle hairstyle, the hair is permed into tight curls, similar to the poodle's curly hair (curling the hair involves time and effort). This style was popularized by Hollywood actresses like Peggy Garner, Lucille Ball, Ann Sothern and Faye Emerson. In the post-war prosperous 1950s, in particular, the bouffant hair style was the most dramatic and considered an ideal style in which aerosol hairspray facilitated keeping large quantities of “backcombed or teased and frozen hair” in place. This necessitated a regimen of daily hair care to keep the bouffant in place; curlers were worn to bed and frequent visits were made to the hair stylist's salon. Mouseketeer Annette Funicello dramatically presented this hair style in the movie Beach Party.

Short, tight curls with a poodle cut known as "short bangs" were very popular, favored by women such as first lady Mamie Eisenhower. Henna was a popular hair dye in the 1950s in the US; in the popular TV comedy series I Love Lucy, Lucille Ball (according to her husband's statement) "used henna rinse to dye her brown hair red." The poodle cut was also made popular by Audrey Hepburn. In the 1953 film Roman Holiday, Audrey Hepburn's character had short hair known as a "gamine-style" pixie cut, which accentuated her long neck, and which was copied by many women. In the film Sabrina, her character appears initially in long plain hair while attending culinary school, but returns to her Paris home with a chic, short, face-framing "Paris hairstyle", which again was copied by many women. When the rage among women was for the "blond bombshell" hair style, Hepburn stuck to her dark brown hair color and refused to dye her hair for any film.

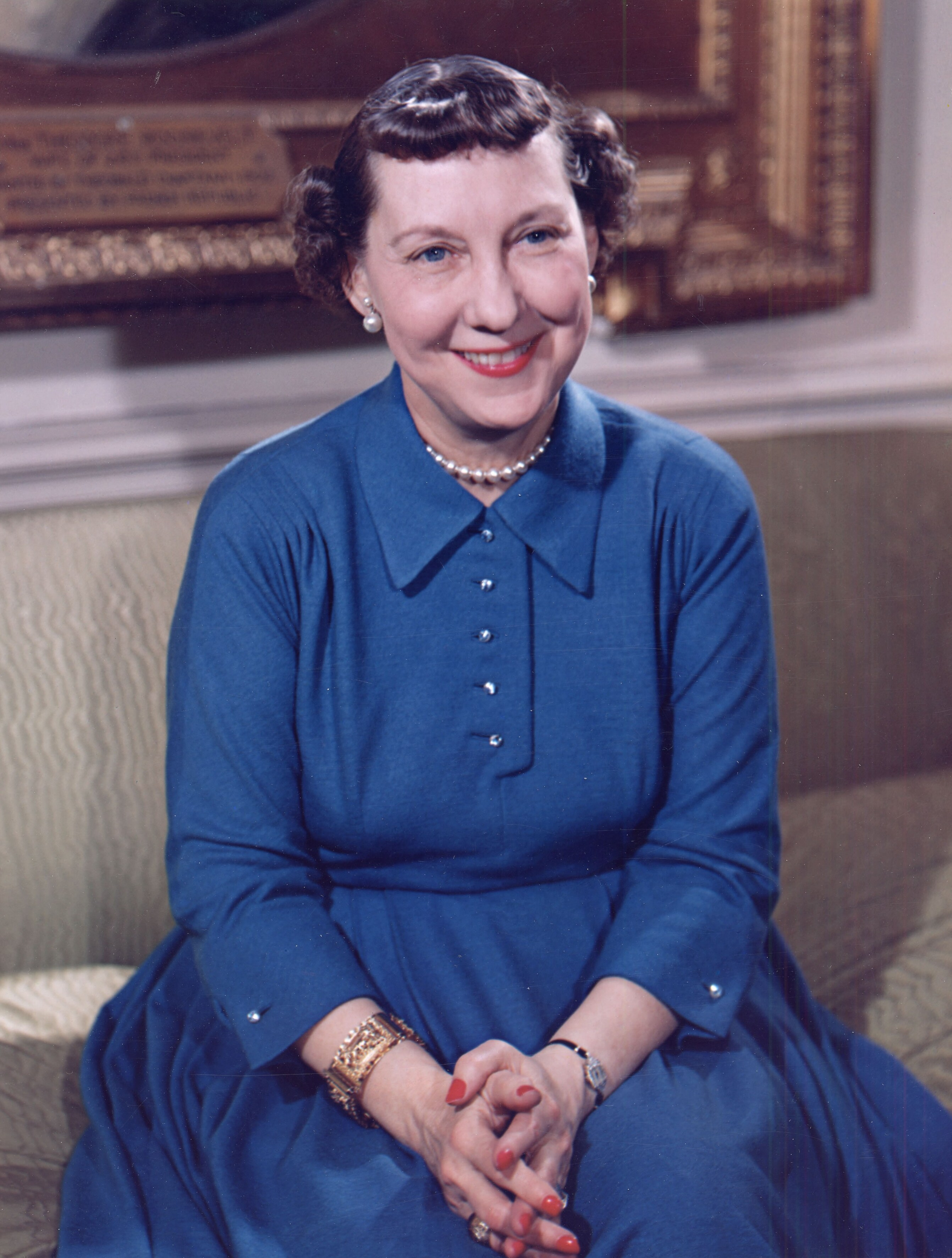
Mamie Eisenhower, wearing a short fringe "bangs", 1954

Jacqueline Kennedy wore a short hair style for her wedding in 1953, while later she sported a "bouffant"; together with the larger beehive and shorter bubble cut, this became one of the most popular women's hairstyles of the 1950s. Grace Kelly favored a mid-length bob style, also influential. There were exceptions, however, and some women, such as Bettie Page, favored long, straight dark locks and a fringe; such women were known as "Beat girls". In the mid-1950s, a high ponytail became popular with teenage girls, often tied with a scarf. The ponytail was seen on the first Barbie dolls, in 1959; a few years later Barbies with beehives appeared. The "artichoke cut", which was invented by Jacques Dessange, was specially designed for Brigitte Bardot. Compact coiffures were popular in the 1950s as less importance was given to hairstyling, although a new look was stylized by Christian Dior's fashion revolution after the war.

== Products ==
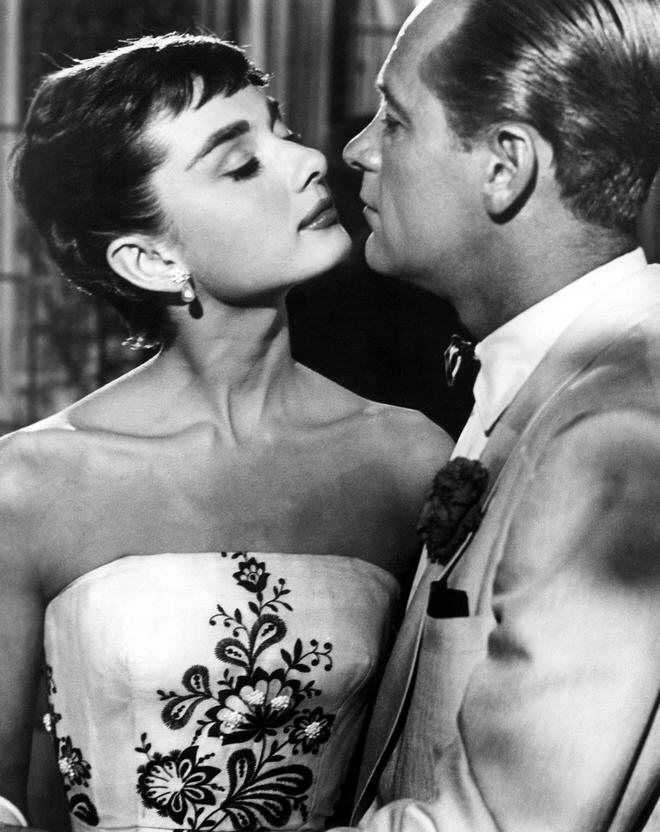
Audrey Hepburn, pixie cut, 1954

In the 1950s, lotion shampoos with conditioning ingredients became popular precursors of the shampoo/conditioner rinse pairing of two decades later. The Clairol ad campaign, "Does she ... or doesn't she?" boosted hair color product sales not just for their company, but across the hair dye industry.

The bouffant style relied on the liberal use of hairspray to hold hair in place for a week. Hairspray lacquers of this era were of a different chemical formula than used today, and were more difficult to remove from the hair than today's products. But even less extreme styles, such as parting hair on the left and the right before pulling the bangs to one side, required holding the style in place with hairspray. One ingredient in 1950s hair spray was vinyl chloride monomer; used as an alternative to chlorofluorocarbons (CFCs), it was subsequently found to be both toxic and flammable.

Hair gels, such as Dippity-do, came in a variety of forms such as spray or jelly, and were referred to as "setting gels". African American hair products promised natural-looking hair to black women, with natural in this context defined as straight, soft, and smooth; these products, such as Lustra-silk, were advertised to not be heavy, greasy or damaging like pressing oils and chemical relaxers of the past.

Only a small amount of Brylcreem was needed to make a man's hair shiny and stay in place; Brylcreem's tag line was "Brylcreem, a little dab'll do ya." It was also used by those who suffered from dandruff. While the conk was still popular through the end of the decade, Isaac Hayes switched to going bald. Hair growth products for men were first introduced in the 1950s, in Japan.

== Influence ==
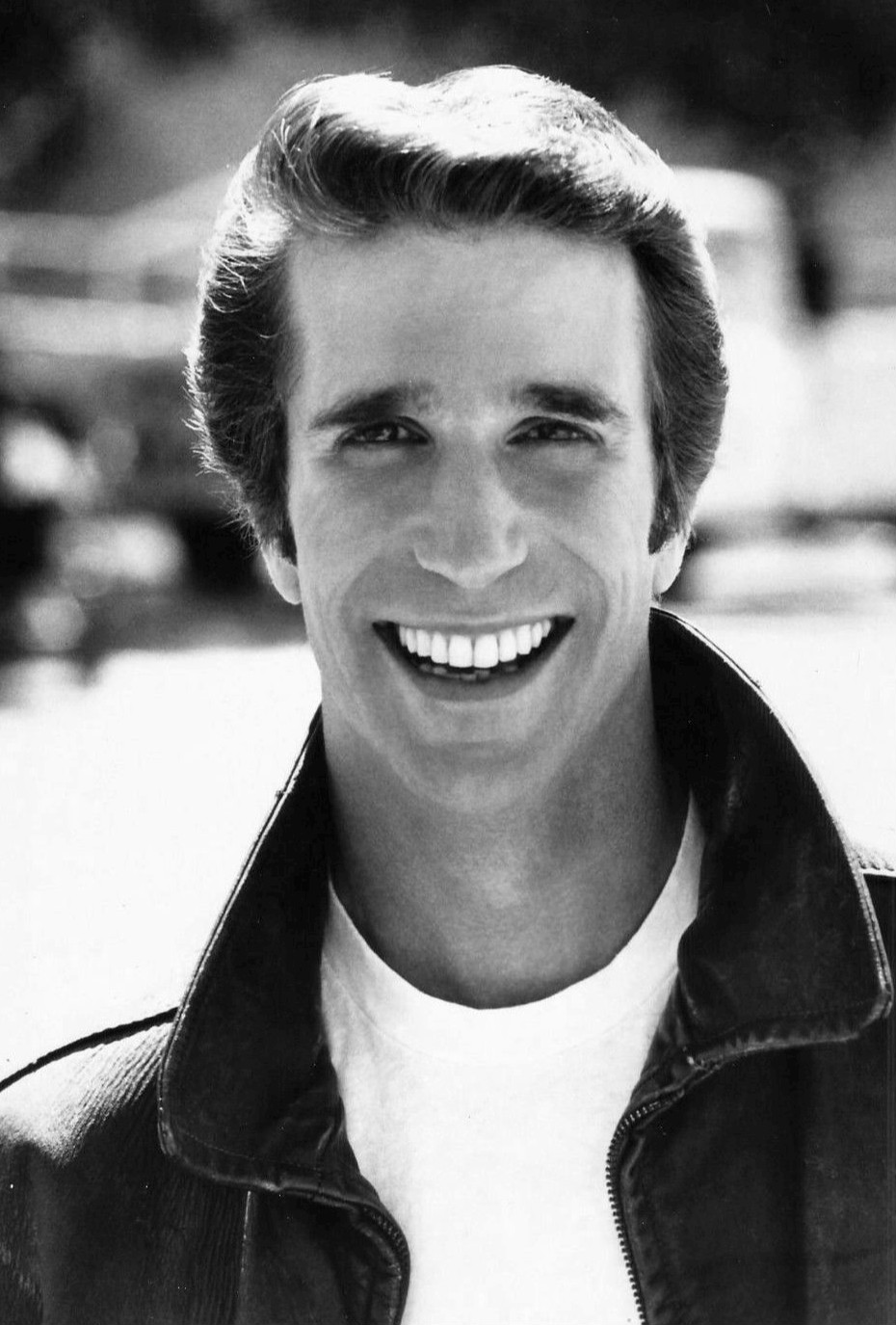
Henry Winkler as "The Fonz"

The 1950s had a profound influence on fashion and continues to be a strong influence in contemporary fashion. Some of the world's most famous fashion icons today such as Christina Aguilera, Katy Perry, and David Beckham regularly wear their hair or indulge in a style of fashion clearly heavily influenced by that of the 1950s. Aguilera is influenced by Marilyn Monroe, Beckham by Steve McQueen and James Dean.

The pompadour style became popular among Italian Americans and the image became an integral part of the Italian male stereotype in the 1970s in films such as Grease and television series such as Happy Days. The Fonz, played by Henry Winkler, with his greased pompadour, white T-shirt and leather jacket, has been cited as the "epitome of the 50s bad-boy cool". In modern Japanese popular culture, the pompadour is a stereotypical hairstyle often worn by gang members, thugs, members of the yakuza and its junior counterpart bōsōzoku, and other similar groups such as the yankii (high-school hoodlums). In Japan the style is known as the "Regent" hairstyle, and is often caricatured in various forms of entertainment media such as anime, manga, television, and music videos.

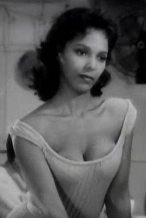
Dorothy Dandridge, 1958

== See also ==
- Hairstyles in the 1980s
- 1950s fashion
- List of hairstyles
