= Lineup =

Lineup, line up or line-up may refer to:

== Groupings ==
- A queue area of waiting people
- A police lineup, or identity parade, of suspects
- The roster of a sports team at a given time
  - Batting order (baseball) in baseball
  - The starting position in polocrosse
- The members of a music band at a given time
- The acts performing at a concert or music festival

== Titles ==
- Line Up (TV series), a South Korean TV show on SBS Channel
- "Line Up" (song), a 1994 single by the British band Elastica
- Line-Up (Graham Bonnet album), 1981
- Line-up (Battlefield Band album), 2011
- The Lineup (TV series), a 1950s American television series
  - The Lineup (film), a 1958 American film based on the series
- "Line Up", a 1993 song by Aerosmith from Get a Grip

== Other uses ==
- Line-up (haircut), or shape-up, a short hairstyle

== See also ==
- Late Night Line-Up, BBC television programme which ran 1964–72, also known as Line-Up
