= Induction cut =

Very short hairstyle

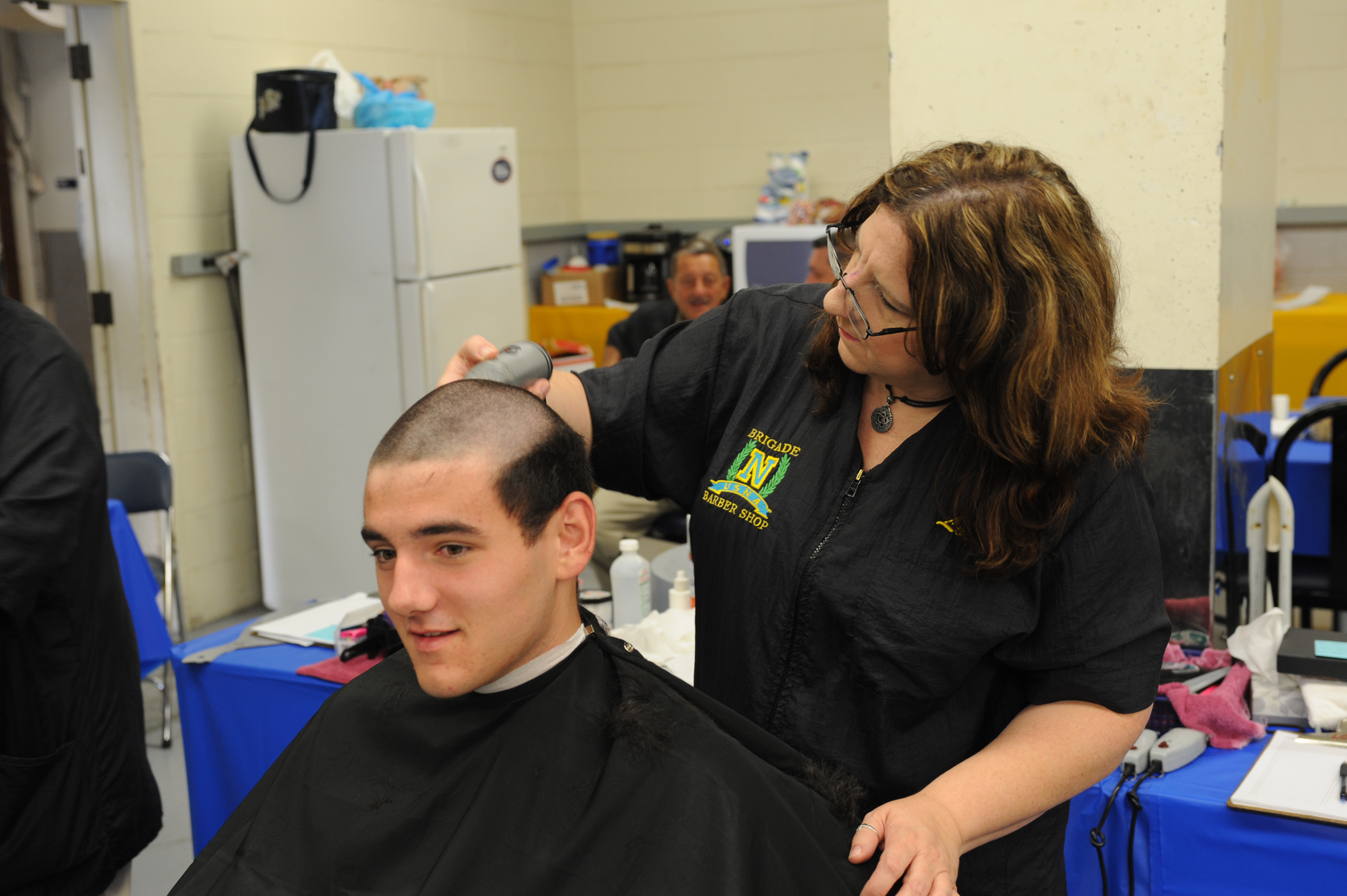
A member of the U.S. Naval Academy's incoming Class of 2019 gets his first military haircut on Induction Day

An induction cut, also referred to as a mighty fine, is the shortest possible hairstyle without shaving the head bald. The style is so named as it is traditionally the first haircut given to new male recruits during initial entry into many of the world's armed forces, but most particularly in the United States.

== Purposes ==
The induction haircut has both practical and psychological purposes. Originally, one of the reasons for the induction haircut was to reduce the chances of disease among closely quartered recruits from different geographical areas (with varying immunities), such as head lice. The haircut also has the psychological purpose of stripping recruits of their individuality and past identities, and promoting the "team mentality" desirable in a platoon of military recruits.

For U.S. male recruits, the induction haircut has become a sometimes-dreaded symbolic rite of passage for entry into the armed forces and is usually performed within minutes or hours of arrival at boot camp. It is one of several techniques used to mentally shock recruits into adapting to their decision to become a member of the armed forces.

Some Army drill sergeants have referred to this cut as the Mighty Fine. Other names for this haircut are the "buzz cut" or a "on the floor" and "the Army's #1 haircut".

== Women and the induction cut ==
Although the term "induction cut" is generally used to refer to male military haircuts, women also receive a form of an induction haircut, in that their hair may be trimmed to chin-length. The concept of an "induction haircut" has also been the focus of litigation, such as in the case of The Citadel where attorneys for the first female cadet, Shannon Faulkner, argued that the "knob haircut" (referring to the college's freshman class's traditional nickname) would "implement rules which altogether denigrate Ms. Faulkner's identity as a woman."

== The buzz cut ==
A buzz cut is any hairstyle where the hair is cut short to a consistent length all over using clippers. The induction cut is distinguishable by the clippers being used without any guard or attachment, resulting in the shortest possible cut. The scalp is not bald and only very short stubble is left. The haircut may be referred to as a number 0.5, related to the clipper setting used to achieve it.

It is one of the hairstyles that balding men often choose.

In the French Foreign Legion this form of haircut, used by all recruits and many légionnaires, is termed boule à zéro (zero ball). In recent years, the U.S. military style of high and tight has also become popular in the Légion.

== In popular culture ==
The opening scene of the Stanley Kubrick movie Full Metal Jacket from 1987 shows all the new marine recruits being given the induction cut by a barber.

== See also ==
- List of hairstyles
