= Regular haircut =

Simple hairstyle popular among males

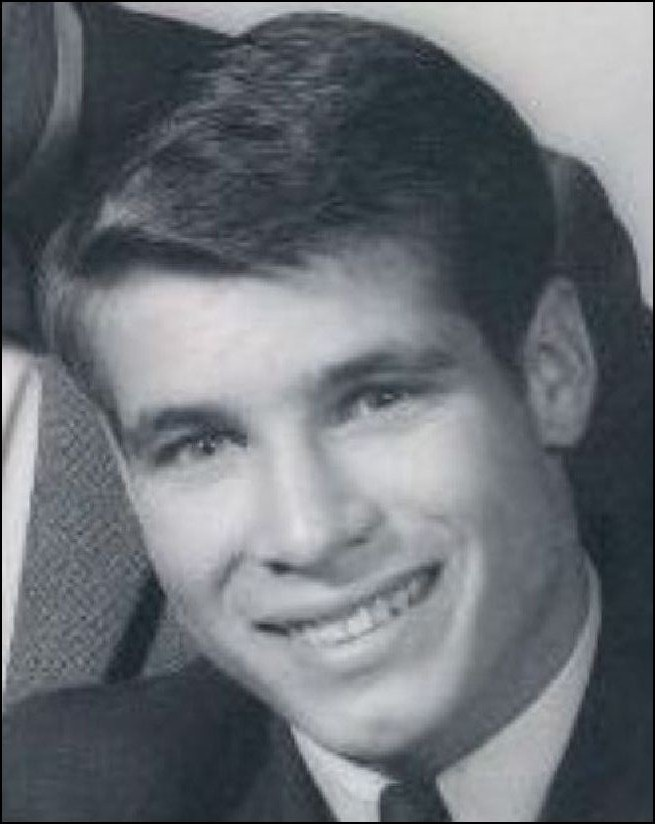
Actor Don Grady sporting a regular haircut.

A regular haircut in Western fashion is a men's and boys' hairstyle featuring hair long enough to comb on top, with a defined or deconstructed side part, and back and sides that vary in length from short, semi-short, medium, long, to extra long. The style is also known by other names, including taper cut, regular taper cut, side-part and standard haircut; as well as short back and sides, businessman cut and professional cut, subject to varying national, regional, and local interpretations of the specific taper for the back and sides.

== History ==
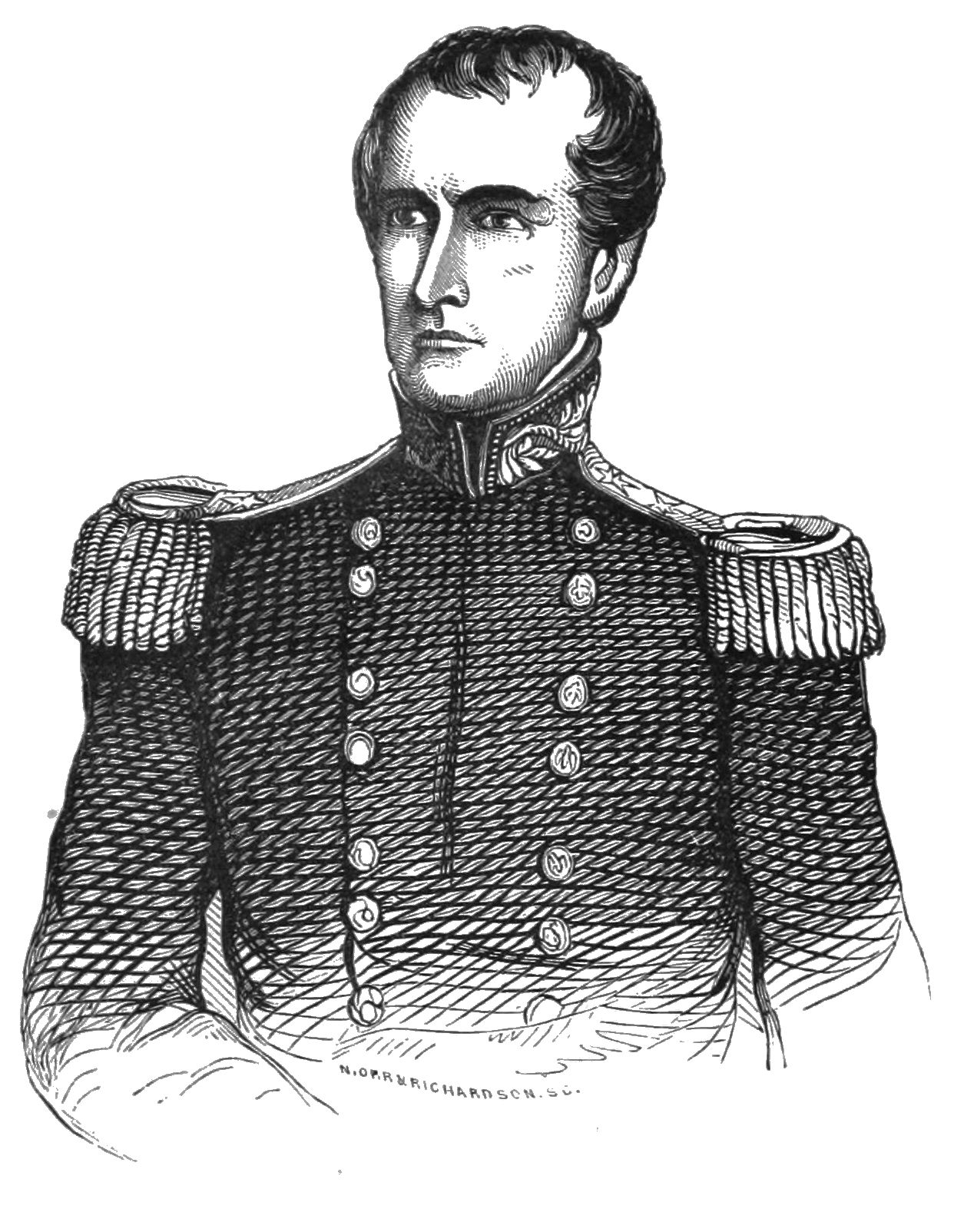
American general John Ellis Wool with regular haircut, 1825

The short back and sides dates back to the Roman Empire, as the regulation haircut for legionaries. Besides preventing the spread of lice, short hair and a clean shaven face prevented the enemy from grabbing a soldier by the beard. By the first century AD, Roman hairstyles were imitated by non-Roman subjects who admired the civilisation that Rome brought. Examples include the Gallo-Romans and Romanized Jews like Saint Paul seeking to distinguish themselves from traditionalists for whom hair cutting was forbidden.

The regular haircut, worn with a long beard, made a comeback during the Renaissance due to European men's newfound fascination with rediscovered classical Greco-Roman artefacts. It was revived for a second time during the Regency era of c.1810-1830 as dandies abandoned the impractical and expensive powdered wigs in response to William Pitt the Younger's hair powder tax.

During the Gay Nineties, the regular haircut gradually replaced the longer hair and muttonchop sideburns fashionable since the 1840s until, by 1910, it had become the norm for professional men. An extreme version known as the undercut was very common for German soldiers during World War II. During the post-World War II period, the business-man haircut, in the form of a combover, became the standard dress code for men's hair in white-collar workplace settings throughout the Western world until the late 1960s and early 1970s. In 2010s fashion, the short back and sides continued to be worn by many professional men, while the related undercut was appropriated by the hipster subculture.

== Elements ==
The essential elements of a regular haircut are edging, siding and topping:

- Edging refers to the design of the lower edge of hair growth from the sideburns around the ears and across the nape of the neck.
- Siding refers to the design of the hair on the back and sides between the edge and the top. Edging and siding, together or separately, commonly referred to as tapering, create a taper (see crew cut).
- Topping refers to the design of the hair at the front and over the crown.

Edging comes first, followed by siding and topping. Edging is typically done with clippers; siding, shears over comb; topping, shears over finger. There are other methods that can be used including all clipper cuts, all shears cuts and all razor cuts. Barbers distinguish between a two line haircut and a one line haircut. Two line haircuts are standard taper cuts. The hair is outlined around the ears and then straight down the sides of the neck.The edge of hair growth at the nape of the neck is tapered to the skin with a fine(zero) clipper blade. A one line haircut, often referred to as a block cut, has the edge of hair growth at the nape outline shaved, creating an immediate transition between hair and skin and connecting the outline from the right sideburn to the outline from the left sideburn across the nape. The outline at the edge of the nape can be in a squared off or rounded pattern. A squared off nape can have squared or rounded corners. Rotary, taper and edger clippers can be used when edging or siding a haircut. Guards and/or blades can be attached that vary the cutting length.

== Tapers ==
A tapered back and sides generally contours to the head shape; the hair progressively graduates in length from longer hair at the upper portions of the head to shorter hair at the lower edge of hair growth on the back and sides. There are a variety of tapers possible from short to extra long. Medium and longer tapers can be referred to as trims; however, the word trim is commonly used to request that the hair is trimmed back to the last haircut regardless of the style of taper. The sideburns and the shape and height of the neck edge are important design elements that can affect the appearance of the face, neck, chin, ears, profile and overall style.

In most instances, a shorter neck or chin suits a somewhat higher neck edge; a longer neck or chin suits a somewhat lower neck edge. An extra wide neck suits a somewhat narrower neck edge while a thinner neck or protruding ears suit a wider neck edge. When slightly longer sideburns are worn than are appropriate for a style, it can shorten the appearance of the face; when slightly shorter sideburns are worn than are appropriate, it can lengthen the appearance of the face; therefore, the appearance of a face that is shorter or longer than average, in particular when due to the length of the chin or lower face, can be normalized by altering the length of the sideburns.

=== Short ===
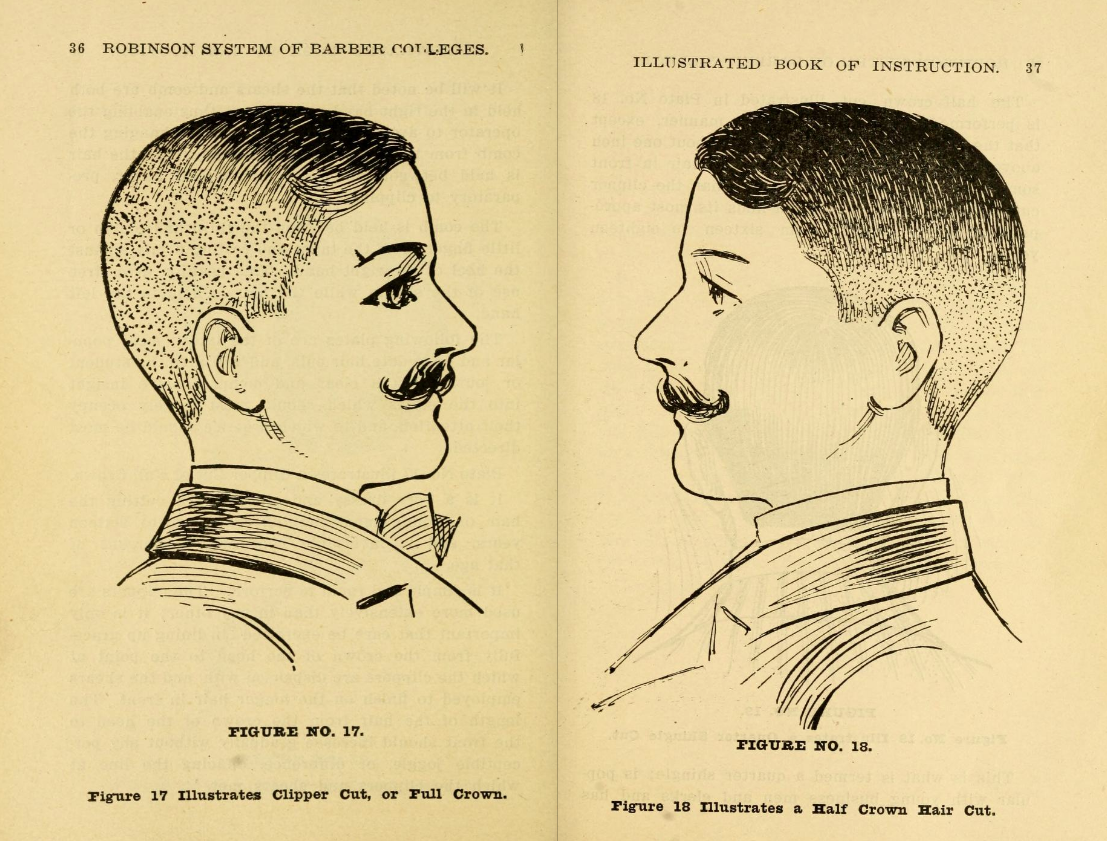
Half vs full crown

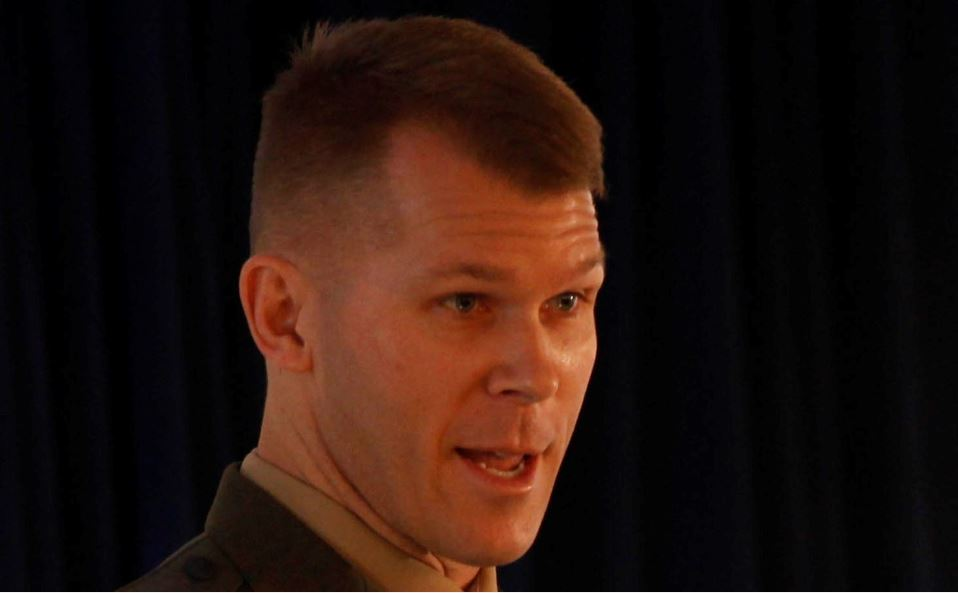
Short taper cut

Other names for this style of taper include full crown, tight cut, and fade. The hair on the sides and back is cut with a coarse clipper blade from the lower edge of hair growth to or nearly full up to the crown. The clipper is gradually arced out of the hair at the hat band to achieve a taper. A fine clipper is used from the sideburn to about an inch above the ear. Clipper lines are blended out so there is a seamless transition between lengths.

Sideburns, which may not be visible at the time of the haircut depending on the color, thickness and density of the hair, skin tone and fine clipper blade used, are maintained short between haircuts. Short sideburns extend to the area where the ear cartilage attaches to the skull or slightly lower if ear shape requires to allow a sideburn to be defined. Can be worn with an ivy league, high and tight, flat top crew cut, butch and other styles; and often the choice with these styles during the summer.

A short crew cut is sometimes referred to as a butch, though with the exception of variant forms, a butch differs from a crew cut in that the top hair is cut a uniform short length. A long crew cut can be referred to in the US as an ivy league crew cut or ivy league. A crew cut where the hair on the top of the head is graduated in length from the front hairline to a chosen point on the mid to back part of the crown as a flat plane, of level, upward sloping or downward sloping inclination is known as a flat top crew cut or flattop. The crew cut, flat top crew cut, butch cut and Ivy League haircut can be referred to as types of buzz cuts. These haircuts have become popular military-inspired styles for men who want a short and low-maintenance look.

==== Semi-short ====
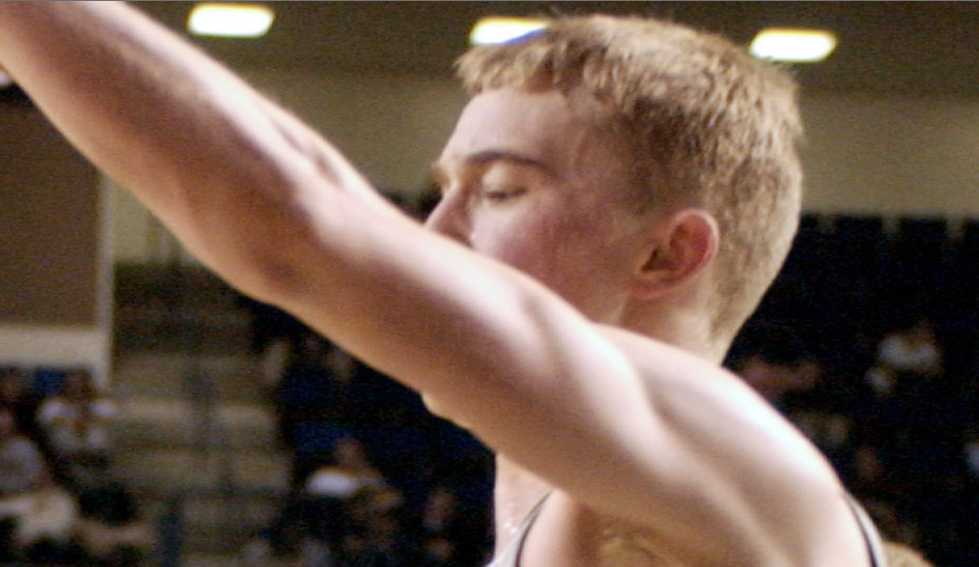
Semi-short

Also known as a half crown. The hair on the sides and back is cut with a coarse clipper blade about halfway up to the crown; the clipper starts to gradually arc out of the hair at the top of the ears. A fine clipper blade is used at the sideburns and at the nape arcing out of the hair to create a blend at a point between the bottom and the top of the ears.

Sideburns are generally worn short as the hair grows out or slightly longer than short but not quite medium. Blending at the upper sides can utilize clipper over comb or shears over comb techniques. While a semi-short taper can be worn with a regular haircut, it is very common with an ivy league, crew cut, flat top crew cut, butch, brush cut, or burr.

=== Medium ===
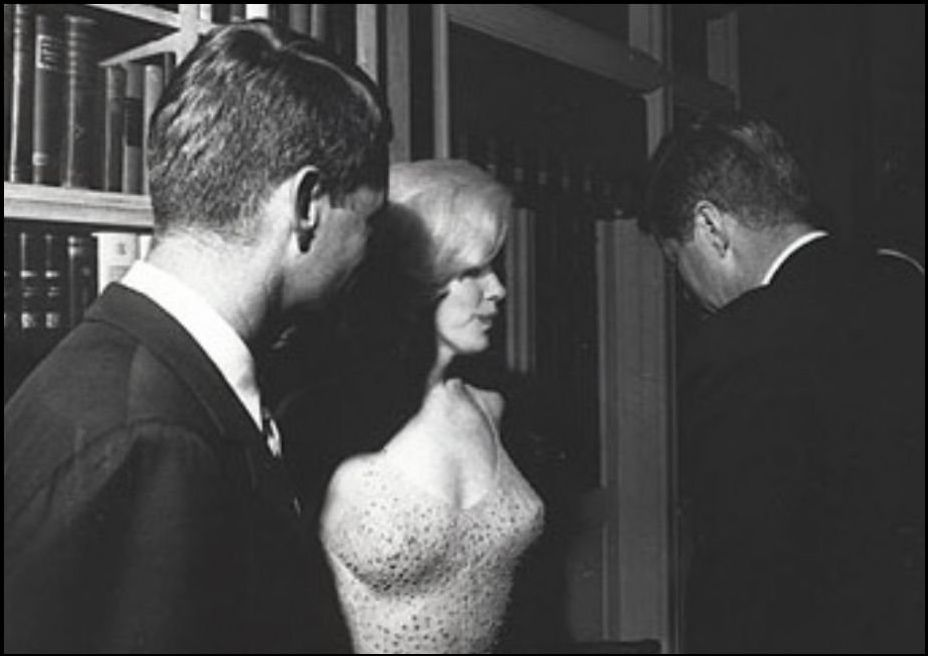
Medium taper cut

A coarse clipper blade may be used on the sideburns, with the clipper immediately arcing out of the hair, completing the taper at the top of the ears. In the nape area, the coarse clipper starts to arc out at the middle of the ears with the taper completed at the top of the ears. A fine clipper blade tapers the lower edge of the hairline at the nape to the skin. The lower edge of hair growth at the nape can alternatively be blocked off in a squared or rounded pattern.

Medium sideburns are appropriate with face shapes that are neither long or short. Medium sideburns extend to the top of the ear orifice. The hair on the middle part of the back and sides can be shortened, thinned and blended using a variety of methods including shears over comb, clipper over comb, thinning shears method, slithering with standard barber's shears, shear point tapering or razor methods. A common style with a regular haircut, medium pompadour or ivy league and also worn with a crew cut or flattop.

=== Long ===
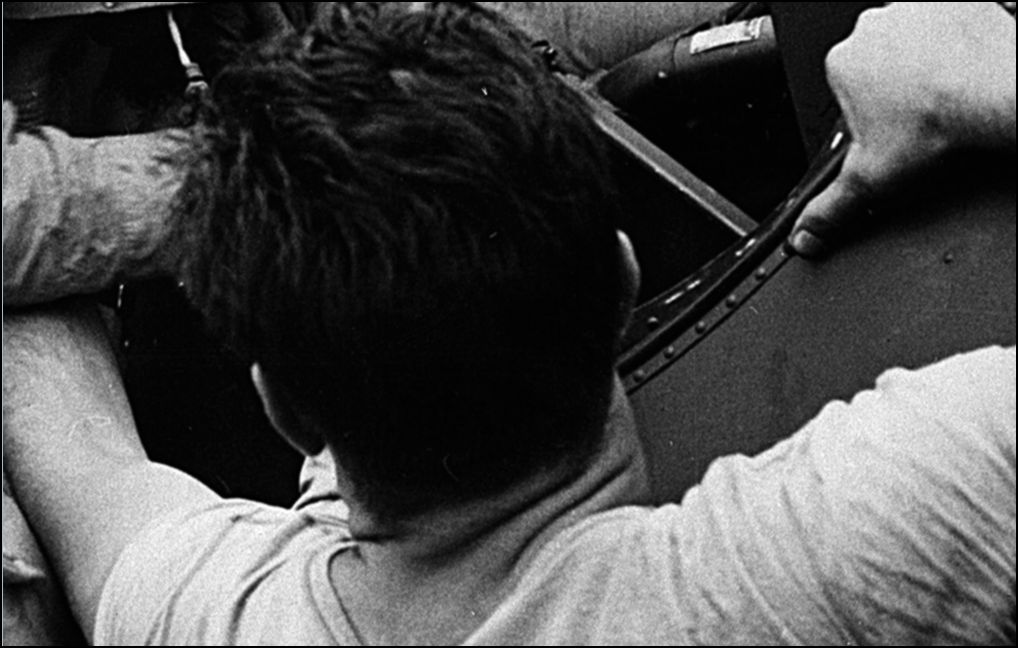
Long taper cut

A coarse clipper blade is used in the nape area, arcing out of the hair at the bottom of the ears with the taper completed at mid ear. A fine clipper blade is used to taper the edge at the hairline. A long taper is frequently blocked at the nape in a squared or rounded pattern instead of being tapered to the skin. Long sideburns are appropriate for average face shapes. Long sideburns extend to the middle of the ear opening.

The middle section of the back and sides is most often cut shears over comb or shears over fingers; can also be cut with a razor. Thinning, layering and blending of the middle section of the back and sides can be accomplished with thinning shears, slithering or razor techniques. Most frequently worn with a regular haircut or a long pompadour.

=== Extra long ===
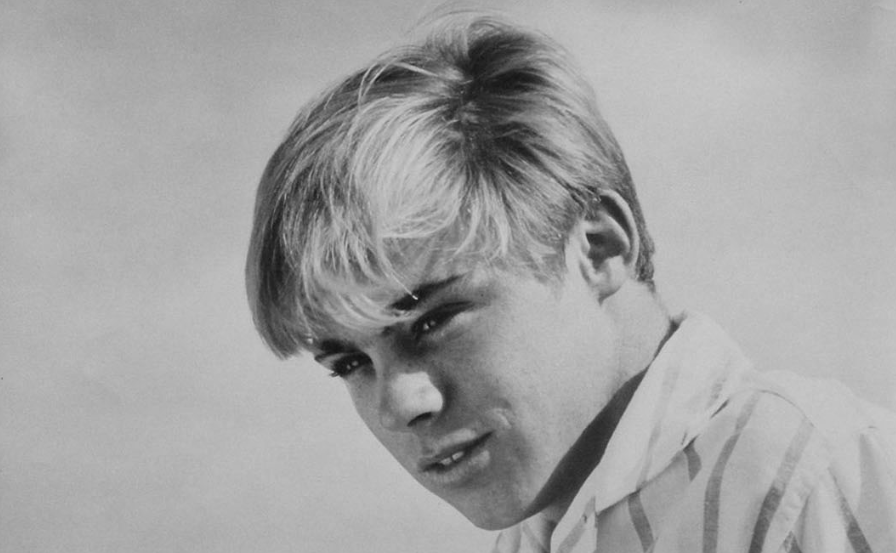
Extra long taper cut

A coarse clipper blade is used in the nape, immediately arcing out of the hair, with the taper completed below the bottom of the ears. A fine clipper blade may be used to taper the lower edge of the hairline to the skin. An extra long taper is frequently blocked at the nape in a squared or rounded pattern; a deconstructed arch around the ears and a deconstructed or shaggy block at the nape are also quite common.

Extra long sideburns are appropriate; extra long sideburns extend to the top of the ear lobe. The middle section of the back and sides is most often cut shears over comb or shears over fingers; can also be cut with a razor. Thinning, layering and blending of the middle section of the back and sides can be accomplished with thinning shears, slithering or razor techniques. Apart from being worn with a regular haircut, also worn with an extra long pompadour.

== Topping ==
Topping includes shortening, layering, and thinning the hair on the crown and frontal areas to attain the desired length, volume, degree of contour, graduation, and layering. The technique most widely used to shorten, layer and graduate the hair is the shears over finger method, also known as finger work. Finger work involves initially lifting the hair to be cut with the comb, then grasping the lifted hair between the index and middle finger of the opposite hand while transferring the comb to that hand and cutting it with the shears held in the hand that initially held the comb. The comb is then transferred back to the hand that holds the shears and the process is repeated in swaths that go from front to back, outer to inner areas of the right and left sides of the top.

The angle at which the hair is held away from the scalp is critical as it affects how the cut hair will graduate and layer. Depending on the area of the scalp and the desired appearance of the cut hair, the angle will range from around 45 to 135 degrees. Shears over comb techniques include the up and over method and the shear lifting method. In both methods, the hair to be cut is held up by the comb and cut with shears.

The up and over method is a continuous process where the strips of cut hair run from the front hairline back or from the side hairline upwards. In the shear lifting method, the process is not continuous but carried out sectionally from left to right across the top of the head proceeding from the crown to the front. For example, there may be fifteen separate sections, three across the top of the head from side to side and five from the crown forward. Cutting proceeds from crown left to crown right and so on to front left to front right. As with the shears over finger method, the angle of the hair to the scalp as it is cut is critical to the layered and graduated appearance of the cut hair.

Depending on the thickness of the hair and the desired volume, topping may include thinning which can be accomplished by a variety of methods including thinning shears method, slithering with regular barber shears or the push back method with regular shears or thinning shears. The hair to be thinned may be held with the fingers or comb. Whorls, cowlicks, and irregularities of the scalp can be addressed by shear point tapering techniques. Only a few hairs are cut in the problem areas using just the tips of the shears, over comb. Topping as well as siding may also be achieved with razor cutting techniques.

== Guards and blades ==
Three types of clippers can be utilized to achieve a regular haircut: taper clippers, rotary clippers and outliner/edger clippers. Taper clippers are powered by a linear or pivot motor. The blades are not readily interchangeable. The taper lever allows adjustment of the cutting length within a certain range, usually from #000 blade length, 1/50 inch (0.51 mm) on the fine side to #1 length, 3/32 inch (2.4 mm) on the coarse side. For longer lengths, clipper guards are attached. The guard will cut at the numbered guard length when the taper lever is in the shortest cutting position. Clipper guards are also known as clipper guide combs. Fade clippers are identical to taper clippers with the exception of the range of cutting lengths which is entirely within the fine blade range. Most fade clippers cut between #00000 blade length, 1/125 inch (0.20 mm) and #000 blade length, 1/50 inch (0.51 mm). As with regular taper clippers, clipper guards can be attached for longer cutting lengths.

Rotary clippers have blades that readily snap on and off. Blades are available that leave from 1/250 inch (0.10 mm) to 3/4 inch (19 mm) of hair on the scalp when the clipper is guided over the head with the teeth of the clipper blade in contact with the scalp. Blades are numbered differently than guards. Rotary clippers are designed to accept a certain standard blade type, so that blades from a variety of manufacturers designed to the specific standard may be utilized on a clipper designed to that standard, regardless of manufacturer. Outliner/edger clippers have a very fine cutting blade and no taper lever and are used to outline a defined arch around the ear and for block cuts, the edge at the nape of the neck.

=== Guards ===
Human scalp hair grows on average about one eighth inch per week or one half inch per month. Most clipper guards are numbered in eighths of an inch. The number of the guard denotes the number of weeks of hair growth left on the scalp when a clipper with a certain numbered guard is guided over the head with the guard in contact with the scalp. A #1 guard leaves 1/8 inch (3.2 mm), one week's growth of hair, on the scalp; a #2 guard leaves 2/8 inch (6.4 mm), two weeks' hair growth, on the scalp; a #3 guard leaves 3/8 inch (9.5 mm), three weeks' hair growth on the scalp; and so on.

=== Blades ===
Cutting blade type	Blade	Hair remaining		
Cutting blade type	Blade	Inches	Millimetres	Growth
Fine cutting blades (also referred to as zero blades)
Fine cutting blades (also referred to as zero blades)	#000000	1/250	0.10	5 hours
Fine cutting blades (also referred to as zero blades)	#00000	1/125	0.20	10 hours
Fine cutting blades (also referred to as zero blades)	#0000	1/100	0.25	15 hours
Fine cutting blades (also referred to as zero blades)	#0000A	1/75	0.34	20 hours
Fine cutting blades (also referred to as zero blades)	#000	1/50	0.51	1 day
Fine cutting blades (also referred to as zero blades)	#00	1/30	0.85	1.5 days
Fine cutting blades (also referred to as zero blades)	#0	1/25	1.0	2 days
Fine cutting blades (also referred to as zero blades)	#0A	3/64	1.2	2.5 days
Medium coarse cutting blades (#1, #1A, #1.5)
Medium coarse cutting blades (#1, #1A, #1.5)	#1	3/32	2.4	5 days
Medium coarse cutting blades (#1, #1A, #1.5)	#1A	1/8	3.2	1 week
Medium coarse cutting blades (#1, #1A, #1.5)	#1.5	5/32	4.0	9 days
Full coarse cutting blades (#2, #3.5 and #3.75)
Full coarse cutting blades (#2, #3.5 and #3.75)	#2	1/4	6.4	2 weeks
Full coarse cutting blades (#2, #3.5 and #3.75)	#3.5	3/8	9.5	3 weeks
Full coarse cutting blades (#2, #3.5 and #3.75)	#3.75	1/2	13	4 weeks
Longer cutting blades
Longer cutting blades	5/8 H/T	5/8	16	5 weeks
Longer cutting blades	3/4 H/T	3/4	19	6 weeks

== Gallery ==
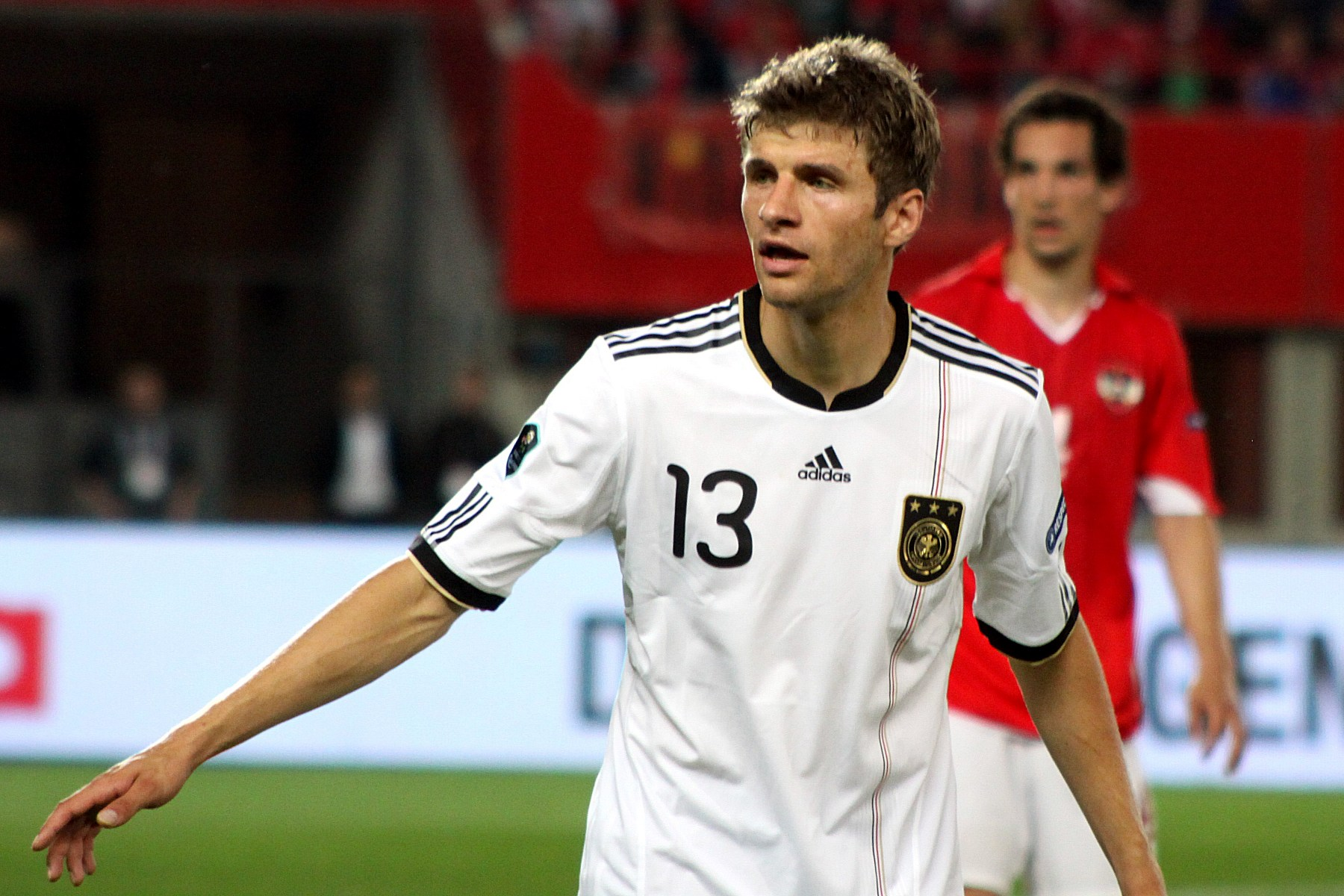
Long

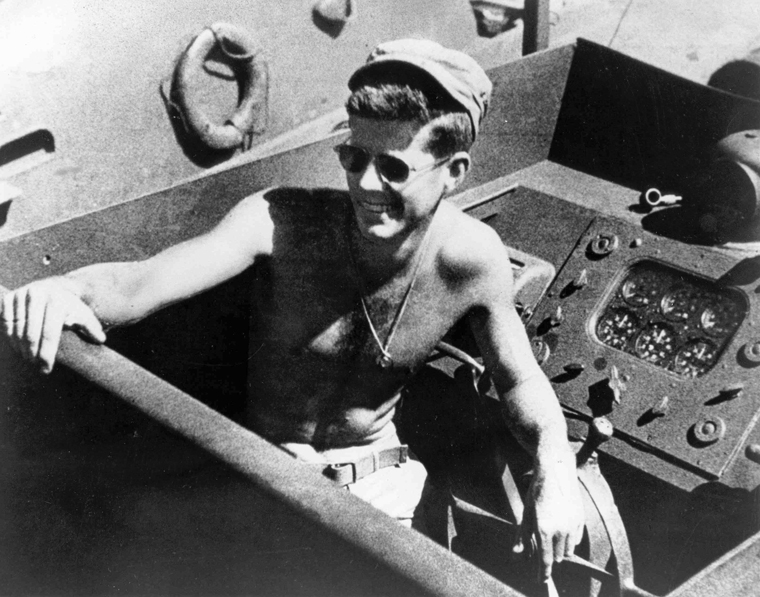
Medium

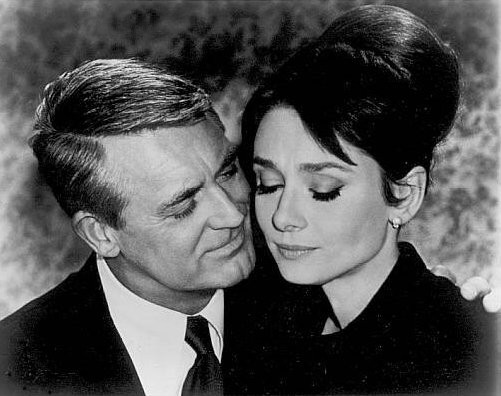
Medium-long

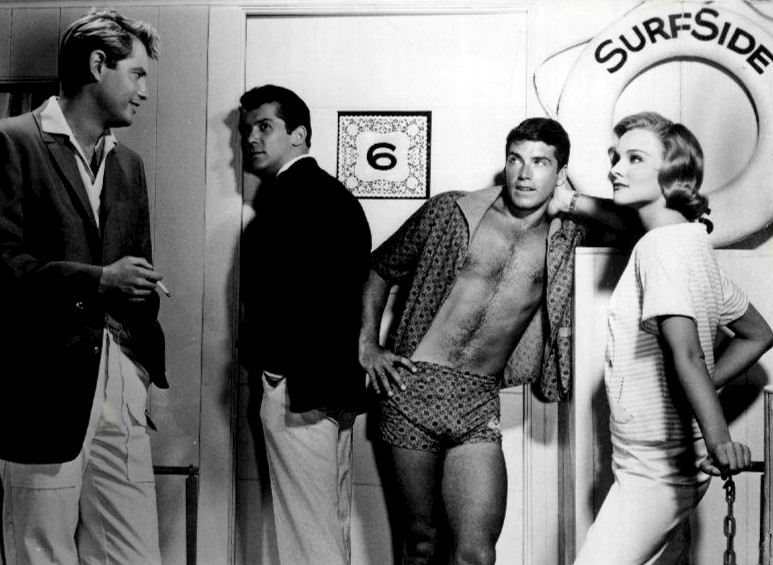
Extra long, long, long (left to right)

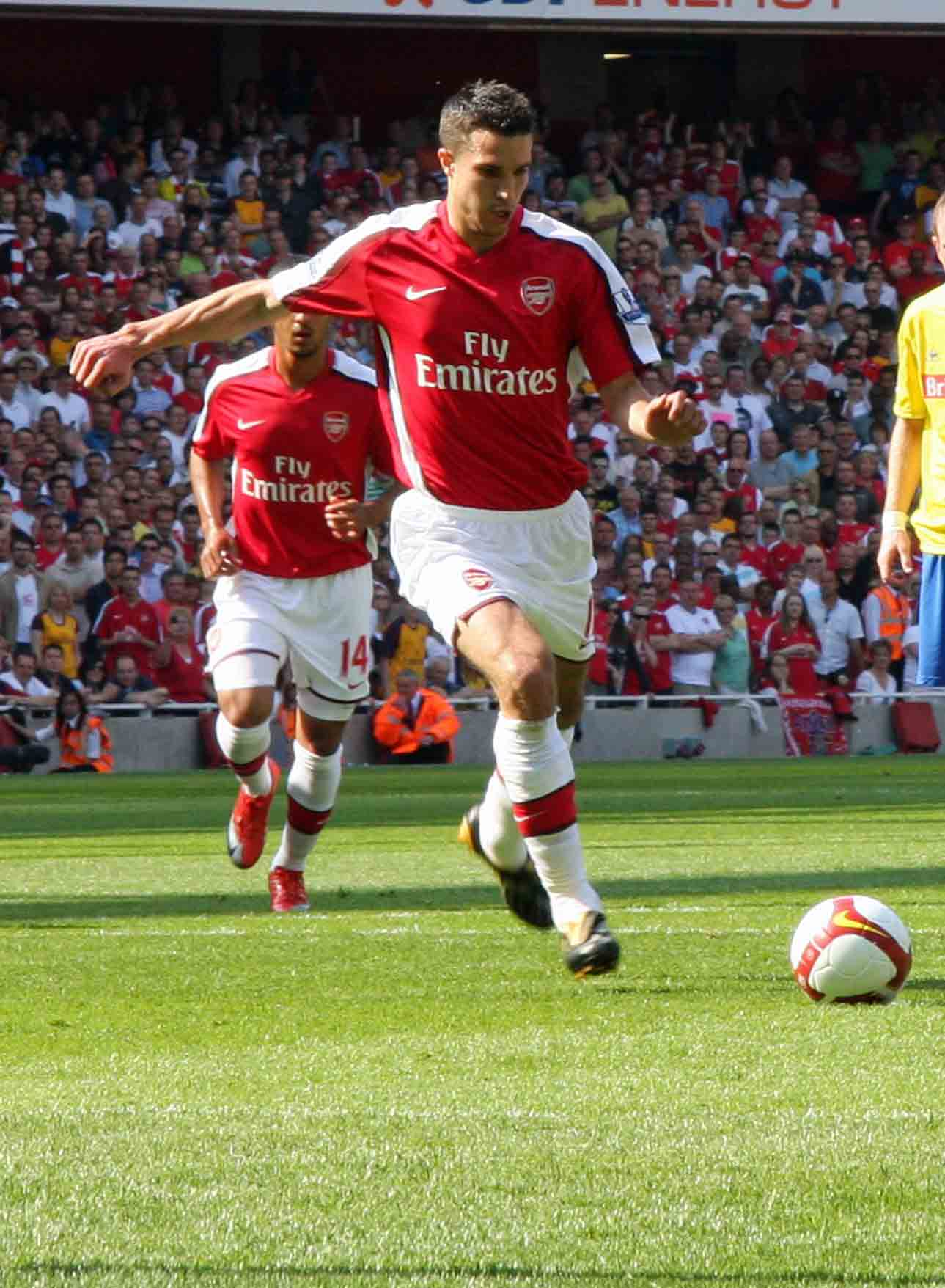
Semi-short

== See also ==
- List of hairstyles
- Brush cut
- Buzz cut
- Comb
- Crew cut
- Curtained hair
- Ducktail
- Flattop
- Hair clipper
- High and tight
- Ivy League
- Mullet
- Pompadour (hairstyle)
- Quiff
- Razor

== Bibliography ==
- Booker, Benjamin (1892). The Secret of Barbering. Unattributed Publisher.
- Modern Barber College (1946). Modern Textbook of Barbering. Modern Barber College.
- Moler, A.B. (1905). The Barbers', Hairdressers' and Manicurers' Manual. Unattributed Publisher.
- Moler, A.B. (1928). Standardized Barbers' Manual. Unnattributed Publisher.
- Scali-Snipes, Mara (1999). Milady's Standard Textbook of Professional Barber Styling. Milady Publishing Corporation.
- Stewart, Helen; Ford, Gilly (2003). Hairdressing with Barbering. Heinemann Educational Publishers.
- Thorpe, S.C. (1958). Practice and Science of Standard Barbering. Milady Publishing Corporation.
- Thorpe, S.C. (1967). Practice and Science of Standard Barbering. Milady Publishing Corporation.
- Trusty, L. Sherman (1971). The Art and Science of Barbering. Wolfer Printing Co.
