= Brush cut =

Type of haircut

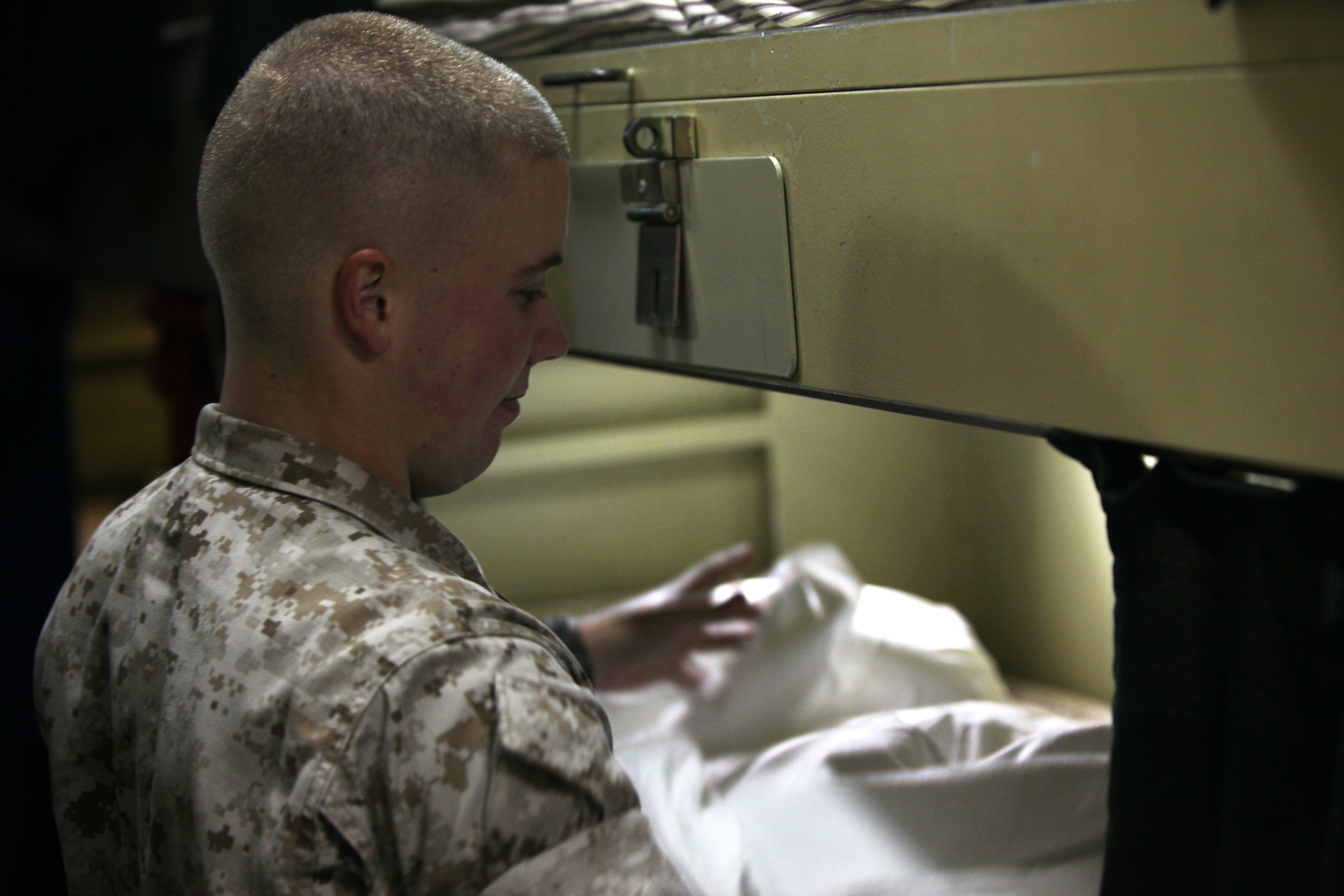
Brush cut Marine

A brush cut is a type of haircut in which the hair on the top of the head is cut short in every dimension. The top and the upper portion of the back and sides are cut the same length, generally between 1/4 and 1/2 inch (6 and 13 mm), following the contour of the head. The hair below the upper portion of the sides and back of the head is tapered short or semi-short with a clipper, in the same manner as a crew cut. A variant form may have a slight graduation of the top hair longer from back to front or a quickly graduated bit of hair at the front hairline to achieve a little flip up of the hair at the forehead. A brush that is cut at less than 1/4 inch on top may be referred to as a burr. A brush that is cut at 1/4 inch or longer on top, and especially one that shows natural curl, depending on length, may be referred to as a short brush cut or brush cut. Brush cuts are traditionally groomed with hair control wax, commonly referred to as brush wax.

== Culture ==
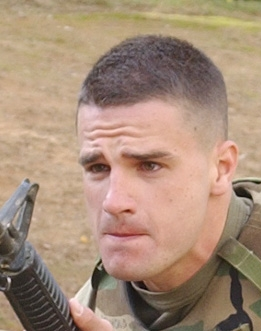
Short brush cut

Brush cuts are commonly used in various militaries, either as form of social conformity to the military or as a hygienic measure. Conversely many punk cultures and movements have likewise adopted brush haircuts as a form of personal identity and of rebellion.

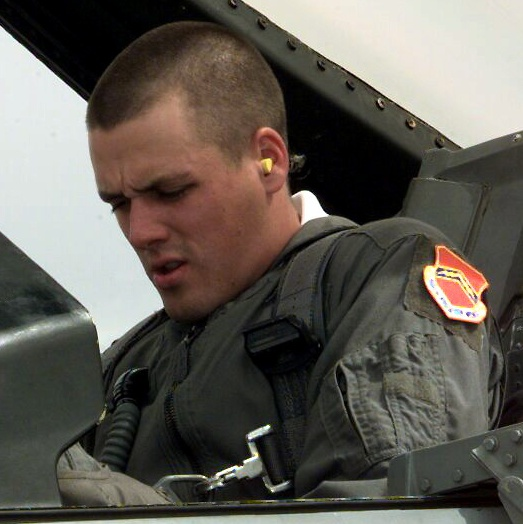
Jake Plummer with a Air Force brush cut

== See also ==
- List of hairstyles
- Buzz cut
- High and tight
- Ivy League
- Flattop
- Mohawk hairstyle, used by the Filthy Thirteen
- Regular haircut

== Bibliography ==
- Sherrow, Victoria (2006). Encyclopedia of hair. Greenwood Press.
- Thorpe, S.C. (1967). Practice and Science of Standard Barbering. Milady Publishing Corporation.
- Trusty, L. Sherman (1971). The Art and Science of Barbering. Wolfer Printing Co.
