= Ivy League (haircut) =

Hairstyle

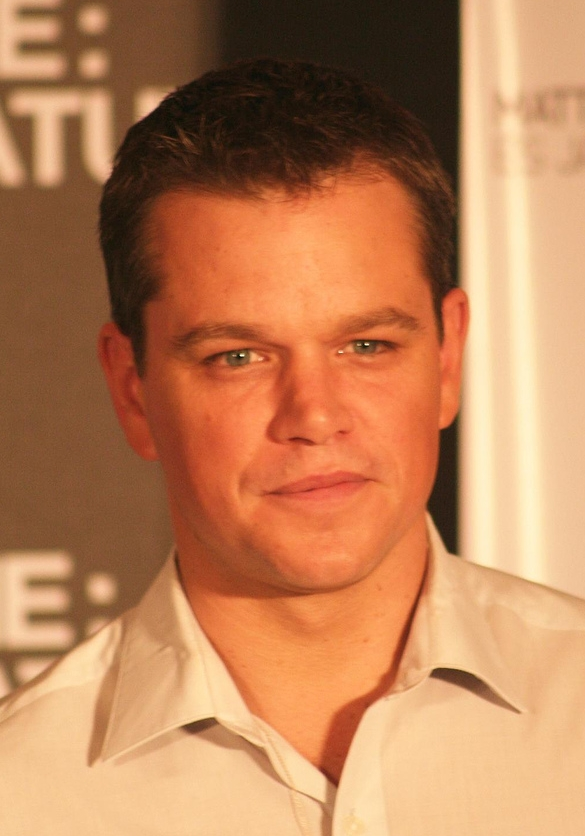
Actor Matt Damon sporting an Ivy League haircut

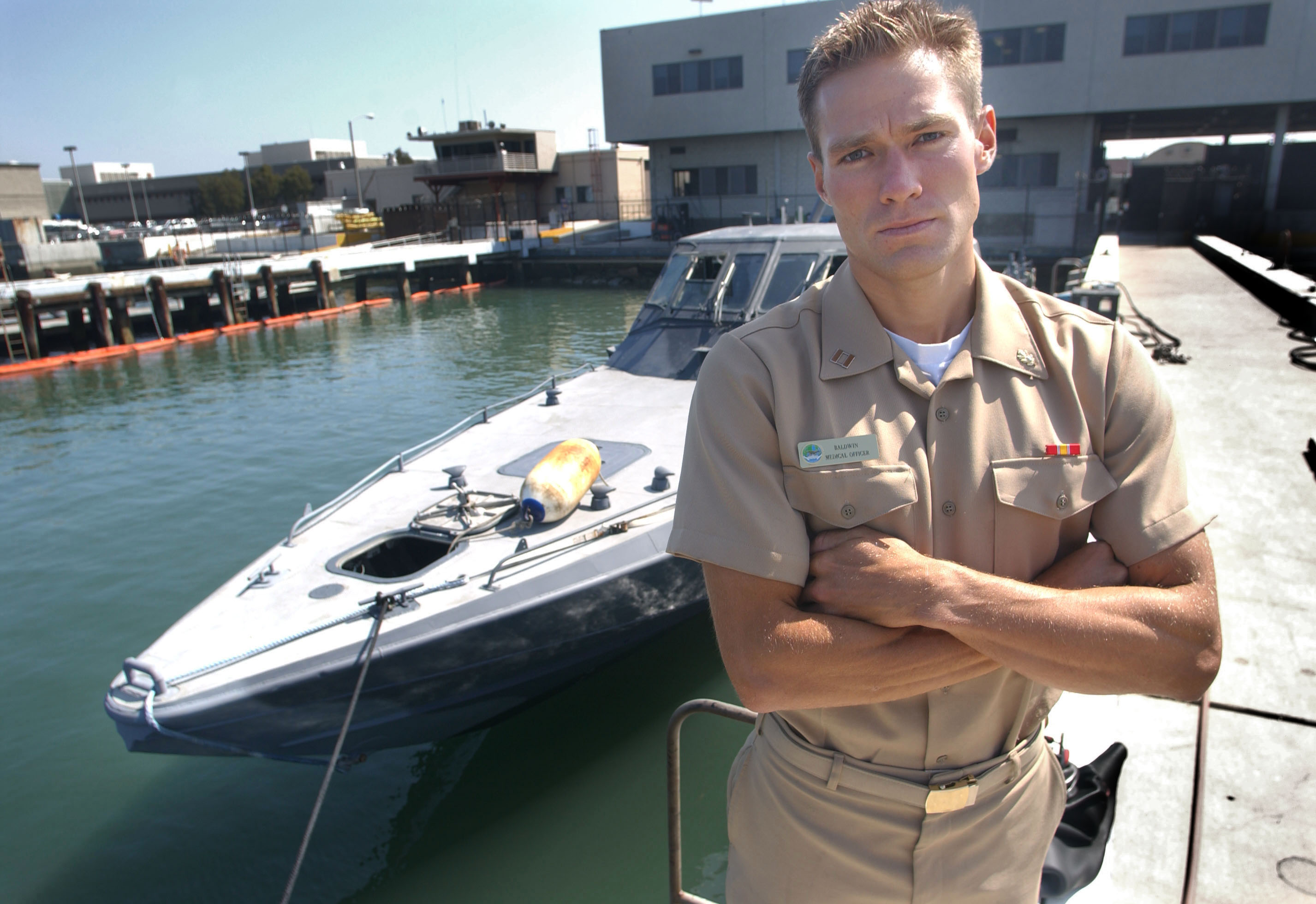
U.S. Navy Officer Lieutenant Andrew Baldwin wearing an Ivy League cut

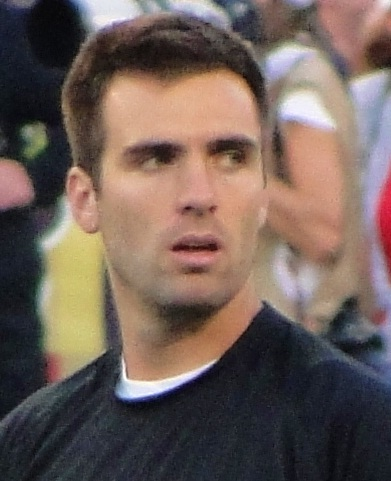
An Ivy League cut worn by NFL quarterback Joe Flacco

An Ivy League, also known as a Harvard Clip or Princeton, is a type of crew cut in which the hair on the top front of the head is long enough to part at the side, while the crown of the head is cut short. The length of the top hair and the degree of graduation shorter, from the front hairline back, varies with the shape of the skull, density and coarseness of the hair, and the styling preferences of the individual: side-parted crew cut, standard crew cut, brushed forward, etc.

On one individual the length and degree of graduation of the top hair might run from one and a half inches at the front hairline, to one half inch at the crown. On another individual, the length and degree of graduation might run from one and a quarter inches at the front hairline to one inch at the crown. The hair on the sides and back of the head is usually tapered short, semi-short, medium. An Ivy League is traditionally groomed with hair control wax commonly referred to as butch wax.

== Styling ==
When worn with a side part and with the top hair brushed to the side, an Ivy League can be styled with or without the short bangs being brushed up to form a short pompadour front. Other options include styling it as a standard crew cut or as a forward brush with the short bangs and the rest of the top hair brushed forward.

An Ivy League and a forward brush are similar length haircuts with the difference being that a forward brush is specifically designed to be worn with the short bangs and top hair brushed forward. A haircut such as an Ivy League, that is designed to be brushed to more than one style may be referred to as a convertible hair cut.

== See also ==
- List of hairstyles
- Butch cut
- Buzz cut
- Crew cut
- Flattop
- Regular haircut

== Bibliography ==
- Thorpe, S.C. (1967). Practice and Science of Standard Barbering. Milady Publishing Corporation.
- Trusty, L. Sherman (1971). The Art and Science of Barbering. Wolfer Printing Co.
