= Shape-up =

Hairstyling technique

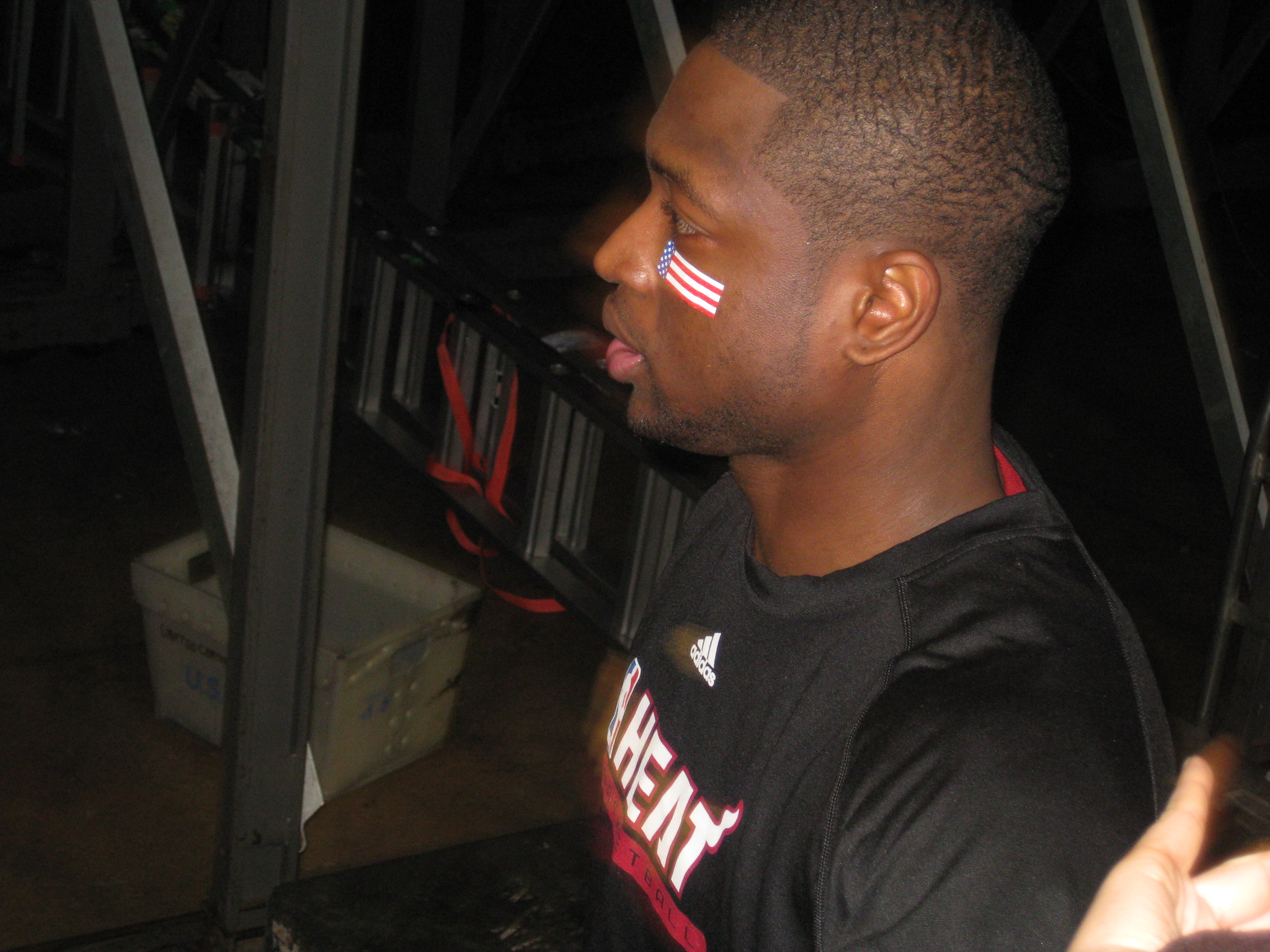
Basketball player Dwyane Wade with an edge-up hairstyle.

A shape-up, also called a line-up or an edge-up, is a hairstyle where the natural hairline is trimmed to look straight and sharp. It became popular in the 1980s, especially among people with Afro-textured hair, and influenced styles like fades, parts, and waves.

The shape-up is influenced by hip-hop and pop culture and is common among entertainers and basketball players.

== History ==
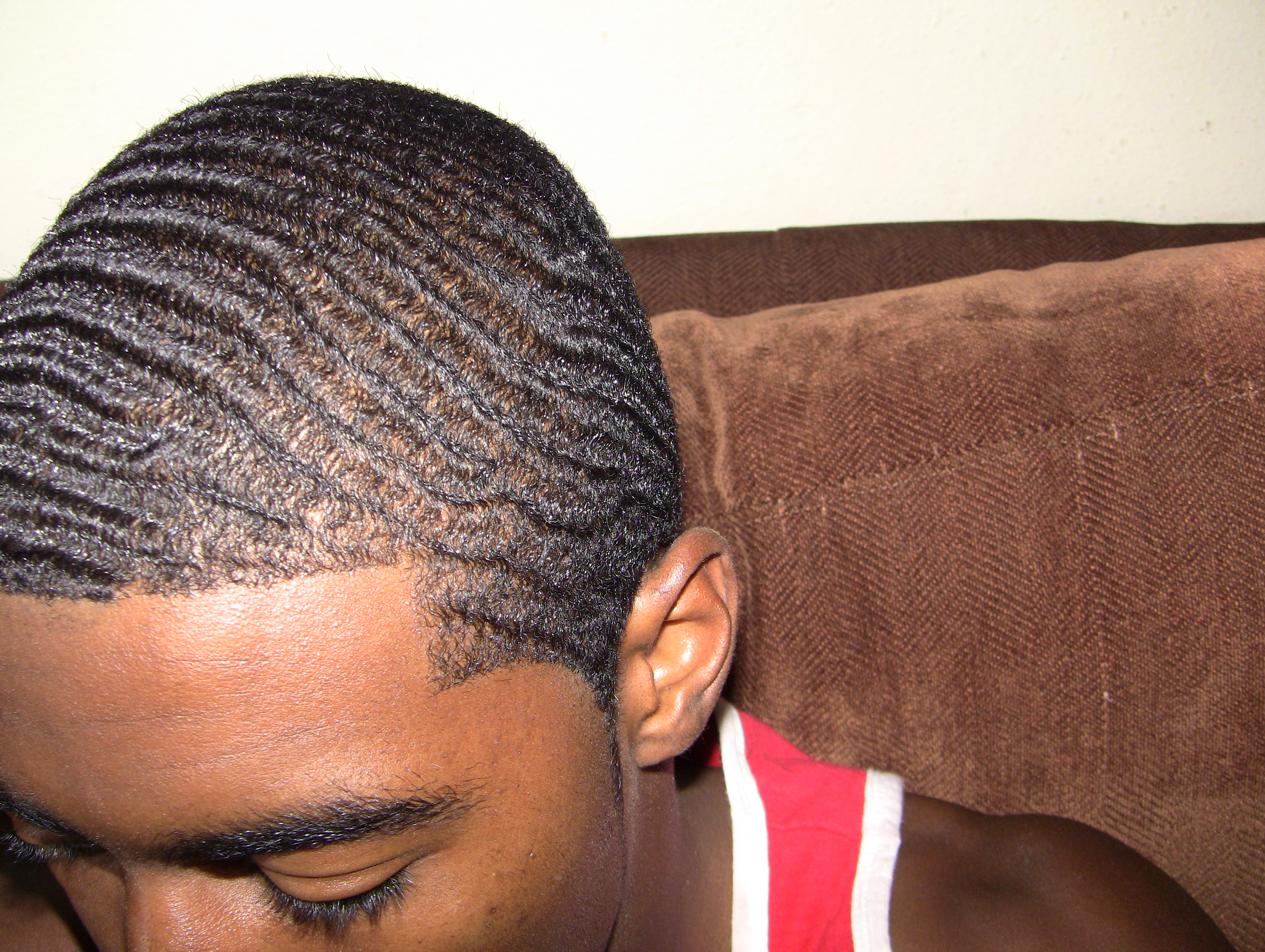
A man with a freshly cut shape-up and waves

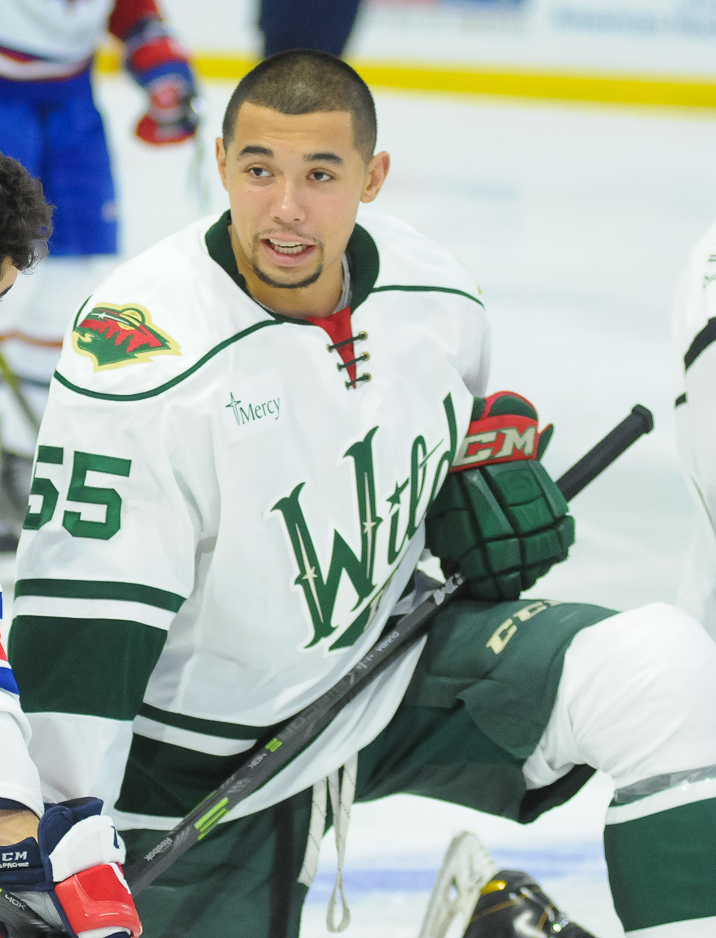
Matt Dumba with a buzz cut and line up

During the 1970s and the era of disco, the afro hairstyle was used African-Americans to reflect their cultural identity and their pride in their hair. In the 1980s, afros became "shaped up" with their sides cut short. The shape-up was first introduced in the mid- or late 1980s. Influential hip-hop artists such as Big Daddy Kane, Eric B and Rakim popularized the hi-top fade with the shape-up.

== See also ==
- List of hairstyles
