= Buzz cut =

Variety of very short hairstyle

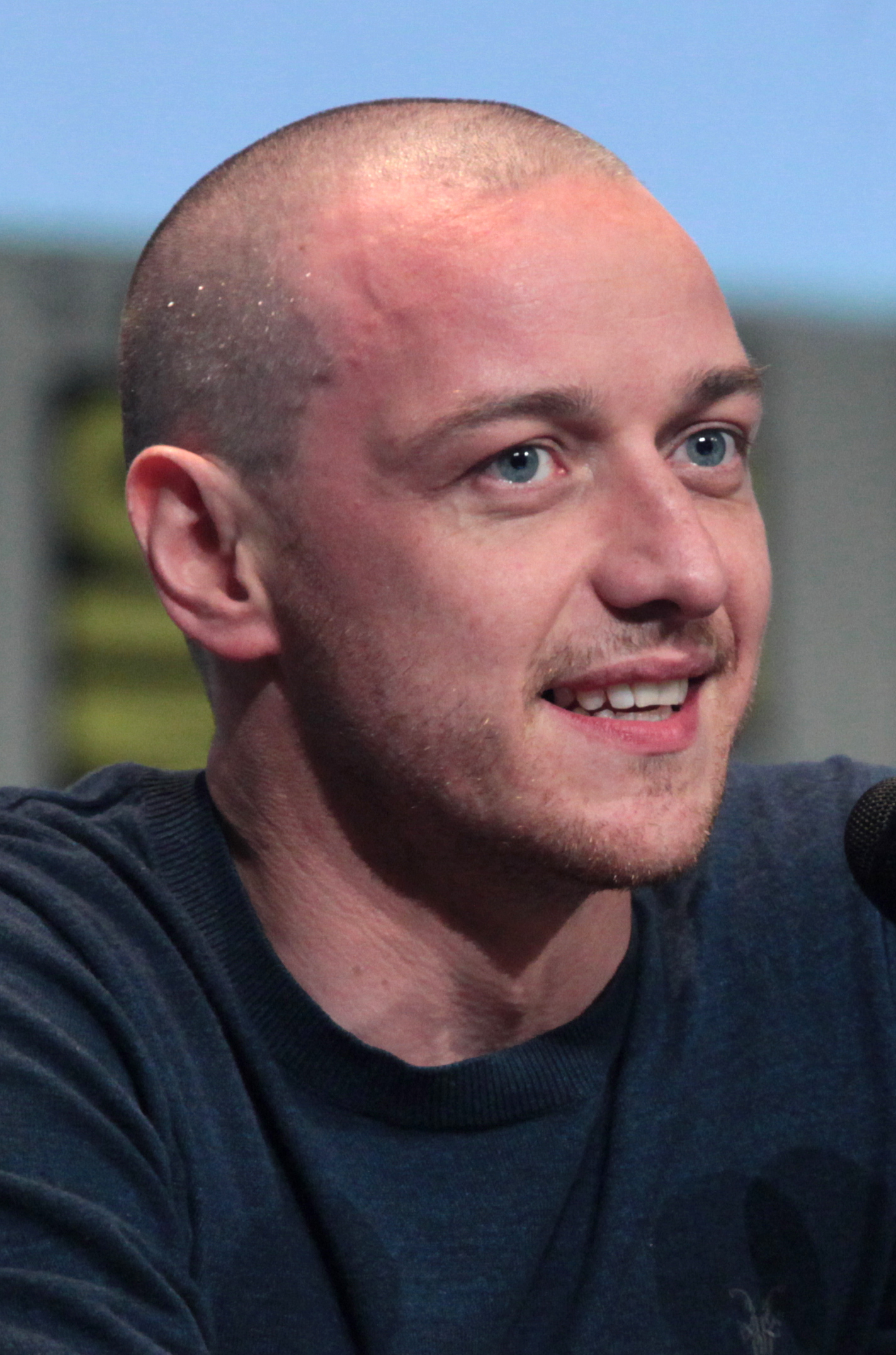
Actor James McAvoy with a buzz cut

A buzz cut, or wiffle cut, is a variety of short hairstyles, especially where the length of hair is the same on all parts of the head. Rising to prominence initially with the advent of manual hair clippers, buzz cuts became increasingly popular in places where strict grooming conventions applied. In several nations, buzz cuts are often given to new recruits in the armed forces or newly incarcerated inmates. However, buzz cuts are also used for stylistic reasons.

== Overview ==
The buzz cut rose to popularity with the advent of manual hair clippers by the Serbian inventor Nikola Bizumić in the late 19th century. These clippers were widely used by barbers to chop hair close and fast. The clipper accumulates hair in locks to rapidly remove the hair from the head. This type of haircut was normal where strict grooming conventions were in effect. Buzz cut styles today include the brush cut, crew cut, and flattop.

The top of a buzz cut style may be clipped a uniform short length, producing a butch cut, or into one of several geometric shapes that include the crew cut, flattop, and other short styles. Also known as a fade haircut, the back and sides are tapered short, semi-short, or medium, corresponding with different clipper guard sizes. Buzz cuts can make the face look more defined and are popular with men and boys who want a short, low-maintenance hairstyle, as well as those with thinning or receding hairlines. However, thanks to the popularization by public figures like Sinead O'Connor, Natalie Portman, Amber Rose, and Willow Smith, the buzz cut has also become a popular haircut amongst women. It has also become a symbol of protest - going against society's standards of feminine beauty.

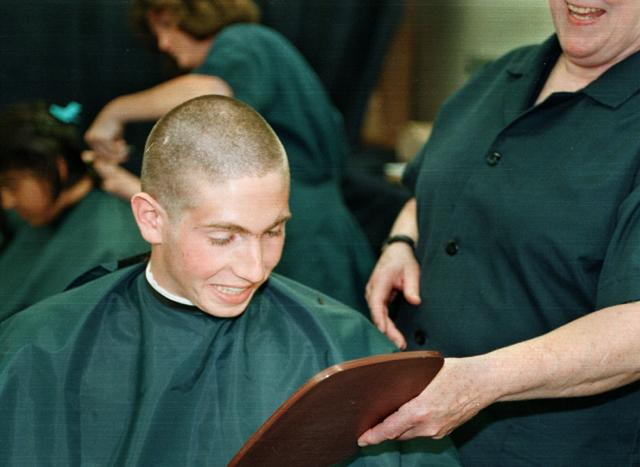
A Naval Academy midshipman with a buzz cut

In countries such as Australia, China, Russia, the United Kingdom, and the United States, military recruits are given buzz cuts when they enter training; this was originally done to prevent the spread of head lice, but is now done for ease of maintenance, cooling, and uniformity.

== See also ==
- List of hairstyles
- Brush cut
- Crew cut
- Hair removal
- Hair § Social role
- Head shaving
- High and tight
- Induction cut
- Mohawk hairstyle
- Shape-Up
