= High and tight =

Hairstyle

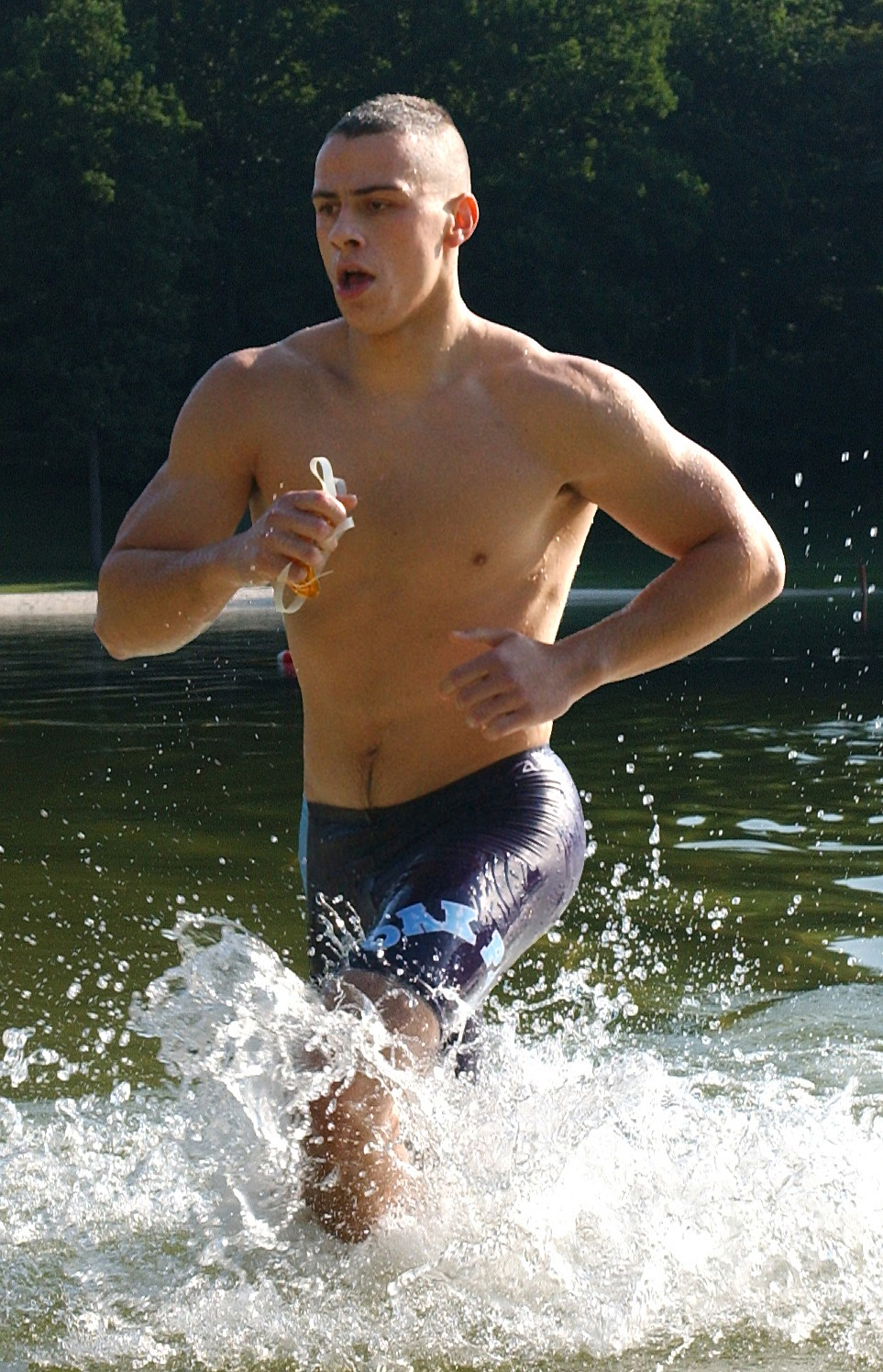
The high and tight as seen on a U.S. Marine

The high and tight is a military variant of the crew cut. It is a very short hairstyle, characterized by the back and sides of the head being shaved to the skin and the option for the top to be blended or faded into slightly longer hair. It is most commonly worn by men in the U.S. armed forces. It is also popular with law enforcement officers and other public safety personnel. Although "high and tight" is the primary term used in military and law enforcement, the same haircut is sometimes referred to by civilians as a "walker".

== Styling ==
While many variations of the style exist, the one common feature is that all of the hair on the sides and back of the head is clipped very close, usually 1/16 inch (1.6 mm) or shorter, up to a point above the temples (referring to the "high" part of its name). A sharp line delineates the boundary between the close-cut sides and back and the longer top portion (referring to the "tight" part of its name). The crown of the head is spared the closest shaving to safely accommodate the weight of a combat helmet. The length of the top portion may vary, usually being 5–10 mm (1/4–3/8 in), but sometimes left long enough to comb. The back and sides of the head are sometimes shaved completely with a razor.

According to U.S. Air Force instructions, U.S. military haircuts must have: "A tapered appearance on both sides and the back of the head, both with and without headgear. A tapered appearance is one that when viewed from any angle outlines the member's hair so that it conforms to the shape of the head, curving inward to the natural termination point without eccentric directional flow, twists or spiking."

== Usage ==
Beginning in the late 1980s, the high and tight crossed over into civilian life, being embraced first by mostly young black males (see hi-top fade) before spreading to other groups. From the 1990s to the present day, the hairstyle has also been popular among Syrian, Egyptian and Moroccan youths.

In Indonesia, the high and tight is known as Cepak (pronounced "Cheu-pak") and is worn by all military and some police personnel, particularly those serving in paramilitary units. The national identity of a male Indonesian Armed Forces member is indicated by this haircut; it is also worn by students of other service academies in the country. Officers of general rank rarely wear the high and tight, with a notable exception being Minister of Defense Ryamizard Ryacudu.

== Variations ==
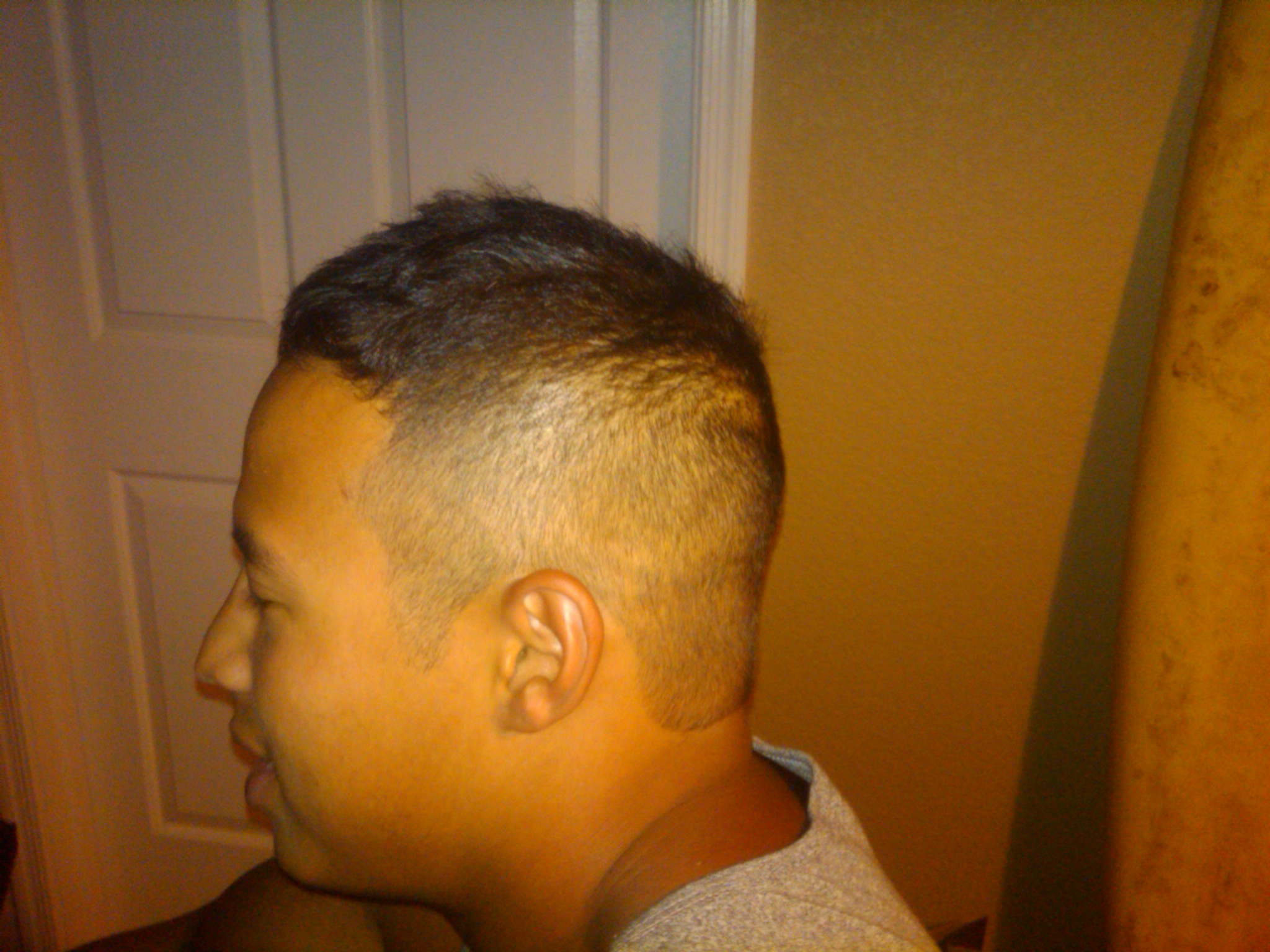
An airman with a recon

=== Horseshoe flattop ===
In this version of the high and tight, the top of the head is clipped in a flattop style, with the hair short enough that the scalp is plainly visible along the centerline of the anteroposterior axis of the head. This creates the distinctive appearance of seemingly having a horseshoe-shaped hairstyle. The exposed scalp is sometimes referred to as a "landing strip".

=== Recon ===
This version has higher boundaries, with the only hair present starting well above the crown of the head. The name is a reference to the haircut's association with reconnaissance units of the U.S. Army, Marines, and Navy. The "recon" can also be cut short on the top to incorporate the look of the horseshoe flattop. The recon high and tight doesn't fade, and resembles a mohawk, but with the hair on the back of the head, sides, and neck cut to match.

== See also ==
- Brush cut
- Buzz cut
- Flattop
- Hi-top fade
- Mohawk hairstyle, used by the Filthy Thirteen
- List of hairstyles
- List of established military terms
