= Anti-Ukrainian sentiment =

Hostility, prejudice, or discrimination against Ukrainians

Anti-Ukrainian sentiment (Ukrainian: Протиукраїнські настрої, romanized: Protyukrayinski nastroyi), Ukrainophobia (Ukrainian: Українофобія, romanized: Ukrayinofobiya), or anti-Ukrainianism (Ukrainian: Протиукраїнізм, romanized: Protyukrayinizm) is animosity towards Ukrainians, Ukrainian culture, the Ukrainian language, Ukraine as a nation, or all of the above.

Modern scholars divide anti-Ukrainian sentiment into two types. One type consists of discrimination against Ukrainians based on their ethnic or cultural origin, typical forms of xenophobia, racism, and broader anti-Slavic sentiment. Another type consists of the conceptual rejection of Ukrainians as an actual ethnic group and the rejection of the Ukrainian culture and language, based on the belief that they are unnatural because they were artificially formed; at the turn of the 20th century, several Russian nationalist authors asserted that the Ukrainian identity and language had both been artificially created in order to undermine Russia. Since then, this argument has also been made by other Russian nationalist authors.

== Ukrainophobic stereotypes ==
Within Russian nationalist narratives and propaganda, Ukrainophobic stereotypes range from mockery to ascribing negative traits to the whole Ukrainian nation, and people of Ukrainian descent include:

- Ukrainians eat lots of salo.
- Ukrainians are greedy.
- Ukrainians are sly and cunning.
- Ukrainians are dishonest.
- Ukrainians are not educated and have no culture.
- Ukrainians are homosexuals.
- Ukrainian women are prostitutes.
- Ukrainians are antisemites.
- Ukrainian language is a broken dialect of Russian.
- Ukrainian nationalism is claimed to be associated with neo-Nazism. This is a recurring theme in Russian disinformation within the ongoing Russo-Ukrainian War, usually in the following narratives:
  - Ukrainians are sympathizers of nationalist leaders Stepan Bandera (Banderovtsy) and Roman Shukhevych, collaborators of Nazi Germany in World War II. Despite the stereotype, 4.5 million Ukrainians served the Red Army during World War II against Nazi Germany. Ukrainians were also considered Untermenschen by the Nazis for being Slavic and treated accordingly. Although Bandera initially worked with the Nazis, he was later imprisoned in a Nazi concentration camp during World War II.
  - Ukrainians are sympathizers of the pro-independence hetman Ivan Mazepa, who wished to betray "the unity between the Russian and Ukrainian people."
  - The whole of Ukrainian society is dominated by neo-Nazis and ultranationalists who persecuted ethnic Russians and Russian-speakers; this stereotype was used by the Russian government to justify invading Ukraine in 2022, with the claimed goal of "demilitarisation" and "denazification".

== History ==
=== In the Russian Empire ===
The rise and spread of Ukrainian self-awareness around the time of the Revolutions of 1848 produced an anti-Ukrainian sentiment within some layers of society within the Russian Empire. In order to retard and control this movement, the use of the Ukrainian language within the Russian empire was initially restricted by official government decrees such as the Valuev Circular (18 July 1863) and later banned by the Ems ukaz (18 May 1876) from any use in print (with the exception of reprinting of old documents). Popularly, the anti-Ukrainian sentiment was promulgated by such organizations as the "Black Hundreds", which were vehemently opposed to Ukrainian self-determination. Some restrictions on the use of the Ukrainian language were relaxed in 1905–1907. They ceased to be policed after the February Revolution in 1917.

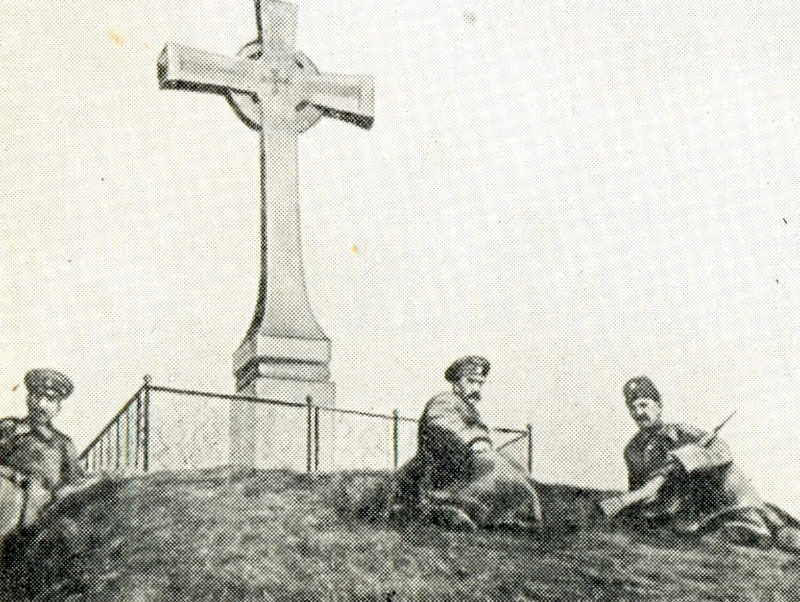
Russian gendarmes in 1914 at the burial of Taras Shevchenko.

Besides the Ems ukaz and Valuev Circular, there was a series of anti-Ukrainian language edicts starting from the 17th century, when Russia was governed by the House of Romanov. In 1720, Peter the Great issued an edict prohibiting printing books in the Ukrainian language, and since 1729, all edicts and instructions have only been in the Russian language. In 1763, Catherine the Great issued an edict prohibiting lectures in the Ukrainian language at the Kyiv-Mohyla Academy. In 1769, the Most Holy Synod prohibited printing and using the Ukrainian alphabet book. In 1775, the Zaporizhian Sich was destroyed. In 1832, all studying at schools of the Right-bank Ukraine transitioned to exclusively Russian language. In 1847, the Russian government persecuted all members of the Brotherhood of Saints Cyril and Methodius and prohibited the works of Taras Shevchenko, Panteleimon Kulish, Mykola Kostomarov (Nikolai Kostomarov), and others. In 1862, all free Sunday schools for adults in Ukraine were closed. In 1863, the Russian Minister of the Interior, Valuev, decided that the Little Russian language (Ukrainian language) had never existed and could not ever exist. During that time in the winter of 1863–64, the January Uprising took place at the western regions of the Russian Empire, uniting peoples of the former Polish–Lithuanian Commonwealth. Next year in 1864 the "Regulation about elementary school" claimed that all teaching should be conducted in the Russian language. In 1879, the Russian Minister of Education Dmitry Tolstoy (later the Russian Minister of the Interior) officially and openly stated that all people of the Russian Empire should undergo forcible Russification. In the 1880s, several edicts were issued prohibiting education in the Ukrainian language at private schools, theatrical performances in Ukrainian, any use of Ukrainian in official institutions, and christening Ukrainian names. In 1892, another edict prohibited translation from Russian to Ukrainian. In 1895, the Main Administration of Publishing prohibited printing children books in Ukrainian. In 1911, the resolution adopted at the 7th Congress of Noblemen in Moscow prohibited the use of any languages other than Russian. In 1914, the Russian government officially prohibited celebrations of the 100th Anniversary of Shevchenko's birthday and posted gendarmes at the Chernecha Hill. The same year, Nicholas II of Russia issued an edict prohibiting the Ukrainian press.

=== Soviet Union ===
"In their time Marko Kropyvnytsky, Ivan Tobilevych, Mykola Sadovsky, Maria Zankovetska, Panas Saksahansky all should have been hanged. Then no one would even have heard about Ukraine."

— Mikhail Artemyevich Muravyov, Red Commander

Under Soviet rule in Ukraine, a policy of korenization was adopted after the defeat of the Ukrainian People's Republic, and it initially supported Ukrainian cultural self-awareness. This policy was phased out in 1928, and in 1932, it was entirely terminated in favor of Russification.

In 1929, Mykola Kulish wrote a theatrical play, "Myna Mazailo", in which the author cleverly describes the cultural situation in Ukraine. There was supposedly no anti-Ukrainian sentiment within the Soviet government, which began to repress all aspects of Ukrainian culture and language, a policy which was contrary to the ideology of Proletarian Internationalism.

In 1930, the Union for the Freedom of Ukraine process was established in Kharkiv, after which numerous former Ukrainian politicians and their relatives were forcibly deported to Central Asia.

During the Great Purge, a whole generation of Ukrainian poets, writers, and interpreters was prosecuted and executed, which further gained its own name of Executed Renaissance.

During the Soviet era, the population of Ukraine was reduced by the artificial famine, known in history as the Holodomor, which was perpetrated against the Ukrainian people between 1932 and 1933, along with the population of other nearby agrarian areas of the USSR. Collectivization in the Soviet Union and a lack of favored industries were the primary contributors to famine mortality (52% of excess deaths), and evidence shows that ethnic Ukrainians and Germans were targeted. According to a Centre for Economic Policy Research paper published in 2021 by Andrei Markevich, Natalya Naumenko, and Nancy Qian, regions with higher Ukrainian population shares were struck harder with centrally planned policies corresponding to famine, and Ukrainian populated areas were given lower amounts of tractors which were correlated to a reduction in famine mortality, ultimately concluding that 92% of famine deaths in Ukraine alone along with 77% of famine deaths in Ukraine, Russia, and Belarus combined can be explained by systematic bias against Ukrainians.

Many prominent Ukrainians were labelled nationalists or anti-revolutionaries, and many of them were repressed and executed as enemies of the people.

In January 1944, during a session of the Politbureau of the Central Committee of the All-Union Communist Party (Bolsheviks), Stalin personally made a speech "About anti-Lenin mistakes and nationalistic perversions in a film-tale of Alexander Dovzhenko, Ukraine in Flames.

On 2 July 1951, the Communist newspaper Pravda published an article "On Ideological Perversions in Literature" with regard to the Volodymyr Sosyura's poem "Love Ukraine" which contained the following passage: "This poem could have been signed by such foes of the Ukrainian people as Petliura and Bandera ... For Sosiura writes about Ukraine and the love of it outside the limits of time and space. This is an ideologically vicious work. Contrary to the truth of life, the poet sings praises of a certain 'eternal' Ukraine full of flowers, curly willows, birds, and waves on the Dnipro."

Modern analysis indicates that the Ukrainian language was underrepresented in Soviet media productions.

=== Anti-Ukrainian hate speech during the Russian invasion of Ukraine ===
Inciting and dehumanizing anti-Ukrainian narratives that keep recurring in this context on social media platforms have been analyzed. They have been compared with hate speech that in the past has been used to justify violence against groups such as the victims of the Holocaust, groups targeted by the Khmer Rouge in Cambodia, the Tutsi people during the Rwanda genocide of 1994, and the Rohingya in Myanmar.

In the case of the Russo-Ukrainian war, approving and promoting the violence includes, i.a., celebrating Russian war crimes such as the Bucha massacre, or the Russian missile strike on an apartment building in Dnipro in January 2023, which killed more than 40 civilians. Social media accounts posting on such themes often simultaneously target sexual and gender minorities, promote conspiracy theories such as "biolabs in Ukraine", QANON, and tend to express support for Donald Trump.

== By country ==
=== Nazi Germany ===
Under Nazi ideology, Ukrainians—along with other Slavic peoples—were viewed as Untermenschen (“subhumans”) and were thus subjected to extreme racial prejudice and exploitation. Nazi Germany did not recognize Ukrainians as a distinct nation or ethnic group worthy of sovereignty; instead, they were seen as a fragmented rural population to be subjugated, enslaved, or displaced in service of German expansionist aims.

Adolf Hitler and other key Nazi theorists considered Slavs racially inferior and politically incapable of self-rule. In Mein Kampf, Hitler referred to Slavs as racially “inferior” and praised the Germanic right to conquer eastern lands.

The 1942 Generalplan Ost, developed by Heinrich Himmler’s SS, laid out a vision of the mass expulsion and enslavement of tens of millions of Slavs, including Ukrainians. The plan envisioned that only a small fraction of the local population—10% or less—would be “Germanized,” while the rest would be forcibly removed or left to die under conditions of starvation and forced labor.

Despite some initial Ukrainian support for Germany in 1941—particularly among nationalists who hoped for independence—the Nazi regime quickly cracked down on Ukrainian autonomy. The short-lived Ukrainian National Government, declared in Lviv by the Organization of Ukrainian Nationalists (OUN-B), was dissolved by the Gestapo within days, and its leaders (including Yaroslav Stetsko and Stepan Bandera) were arrested.

Reichskommissar Erich Koch, appointed to administer occupied Ukraine, openly declared contempt for the local population:

“We are a master race… I will squeeze the last drop out of the country. I did not come to spread bliss.” — Erich Koch, Reichskommissar of Ukraine

Under Koch’s brutal rule, millions of Ukrainians were subjected to forced labor, starvation policies, and mass executions. An estimated 2.2 million Ukrainians were deported to work as Ostarbeiter (“Eastern workers”) in Germany under slave-like conditions.

Nazi propaganda and administrative documents routinely dehumanized Ukrainians. A 1942 directive from the SS stated:

“Ukrainians, like all Russians, are to be viewed as primitive people. They should be taught only simple labor, not politics, culture, or higher learning.”

This systematic denial of education, cultural development, and self-determination exemplified the Nazis’ broader strategy: to erase Ukrainian identity and absorb the territory into a racially stratified German empire.

=== Ukraine ===
On Sunday, 15 July 2012, the national television broadcasting station in Ukraine, First National, in its news program "Weekly overview" (Ukrainian: Підсумки тижня, romanized: Pidsumky tyzhnia) showed a video footage on the development of anti-Ukrainian sentiments within Ukraine.

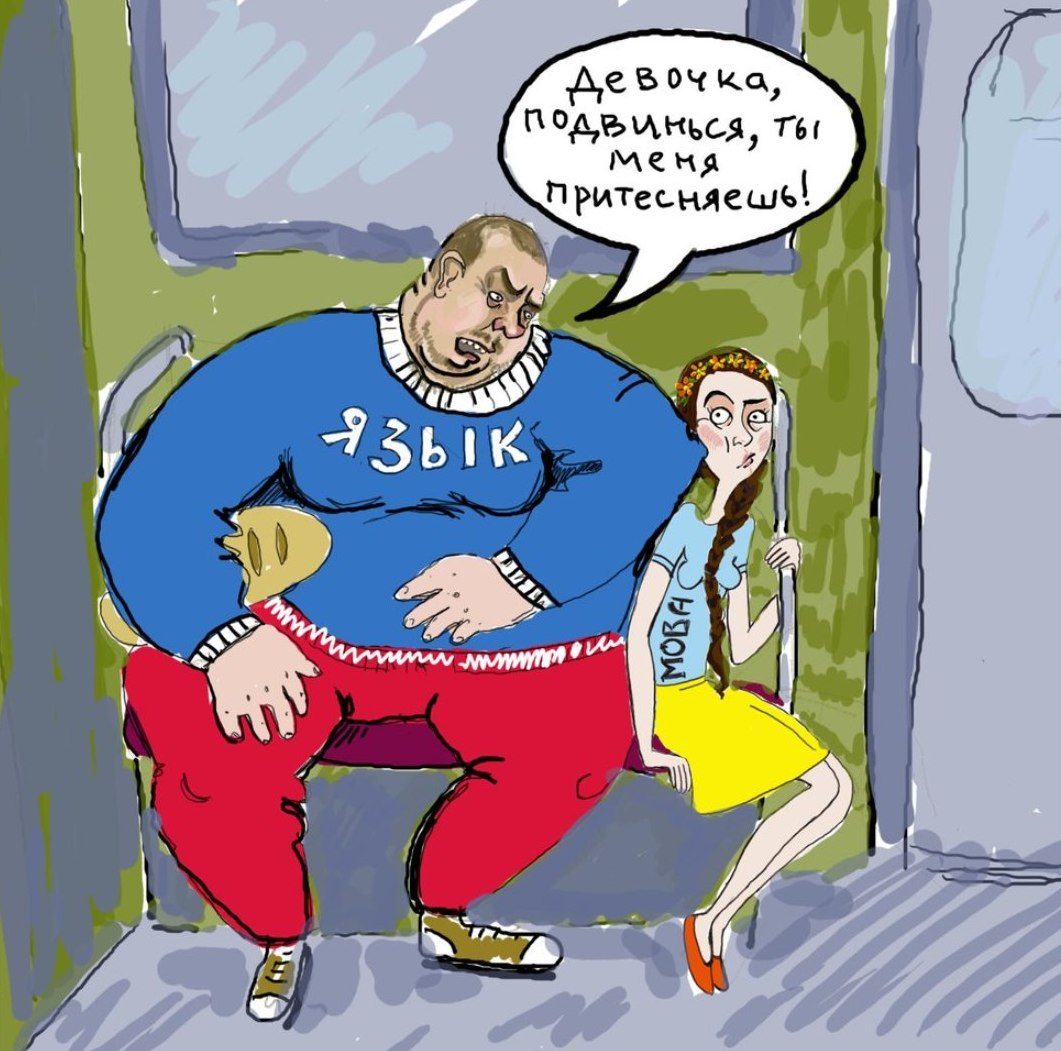
Caricature from Vidsich: the Russian language is shown as a big man, telling a girl representing the Ukrainian language: "Little girl, move over! You're oppressing me!" in Russian. There is a pun on grammatical genders: the noun for "language" in Russian, Jazyk, is masculine, while the Ukrainian word for "language", Mova, is feminine.

A propaganda article posted on the website of the Kremenchuk department of the Communist Party of Ukraine argues that the history that was published during the Soviet regime was the true history, and that new historical facts being uncovered from the archives are false. The article also denies the existence of the Ukrainian culture.

Mykola Levchenko, a Ukrainian parliamentarian from the Party of Regions, and the deputy of the Donetsk City Council, publicly stated that there should be only one language, Russian. He says that the Ukrainian language is impractical and should be avoided. Levchenko called Ukrainian the language of folklore and anecdotes. However, he says he will speak the literary Ukrainian language on principle, once Russian is adopted as the sole state language. Anna German, the spokesperson of the same party, highly criticized those statements.

Mykhailo Bakharev, the vice-speaker of the Crimean Autonomous Republic parliament (and chief editor of Krymskaya Pravda), openly says that there is no Ukrainian language and that it is the language of the non-educated part of the population. He falsely claimed that it was invented by Taras Shevchenko and others. He also believes that there is no Ukrainian nation, there is no future for the Ukrainian State, and that Ukrainization needs to be stopped.

==== Minister of Education of Ukraine ====
The former Ukrainian Minister of Science and Education, Dmytro Tabachnyk, sparked protests calling him anti-Ukrainian in some parts of Ukraine due to his statements about Western Ukrainians, his preference for the Russian language, and his denial of the Holodomor. Tabachnyk's view of Ukraine's history includes the thesis that western Ukrainians aren't really Ukrainian. In an article for the Russian newspaper Izvestia, Tabachnyk wrote in 2009: "Halychany (western Ukrainians) practically don't have anything in common with the people of Great Ukraine, not in mentality, not in religion, not in linguistics, not in the political arena". "We have different enemies and different allies. Furthermore, our allies and even brothers are their enemies, and their "heroes" (Stepan Bandera, Roman Shukhevych) for us are killers, traitors and abettors of Hitler's executioners." By 17 March 2010, four of western Ukraine's regional councils had passed resolutions calling for the minister's dismissal. A host of civic and student organizations from all over the country (including Kherson in southern Ukraine and Donetsk in eastern Ukraine), authors, and former Soviet dissidents also signed petitions calling for his removal. Tabachnik also had stated that Ukrainian history textbooks contained "simply false" information and announced his intention to rewrite them.

=== Russia ===
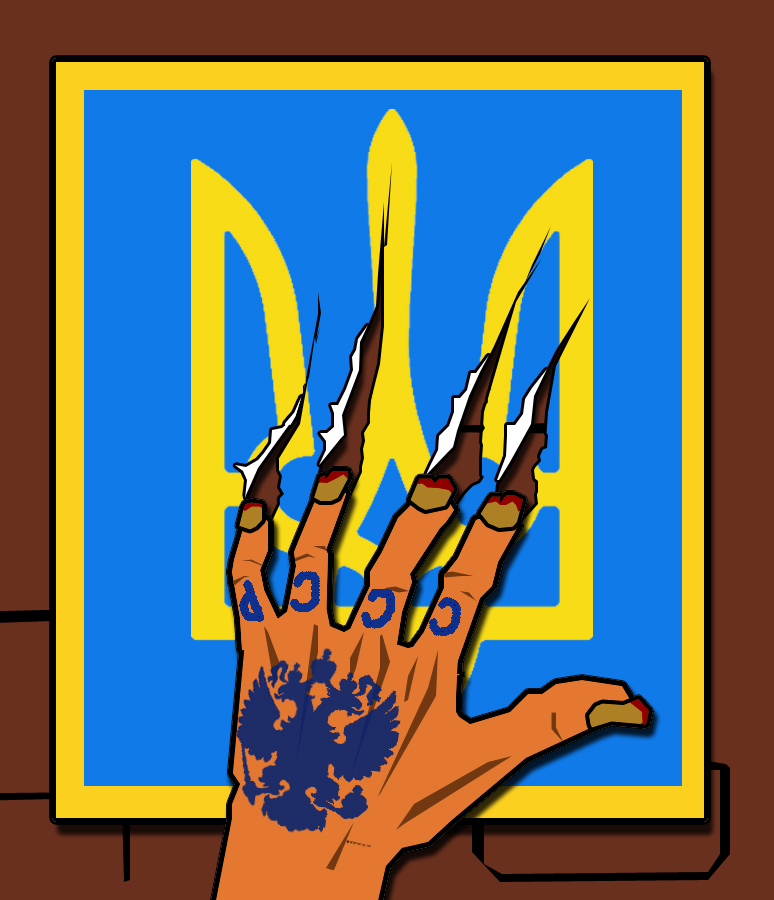
Ukrainophobia by Vitaliy Sichkarchuk

In response to Ukraine's 1991 declaration of independence, a prominent Russian poet, Joseph Brodsky, wrote a deeply offensive poem On the Independence of Ukraine. The poem was rediscovered and popularized by Russian state media in 2015 at the peak of the war in Donbas.

In a poll held by Levada Center in June 2009 in Russia, 75% of Russian respondents respected Ukrainians as an ethnic group, but 55% were negative about Ukraine as the state. In May 2009, 96% of Ukrainians polled by Kyiv International Sociology Institute were positive about Russians as an ethnic group, 93% respected the Russian Federation, and 76% respected the Russian establishment.

Some Russian media seem to try to discredit Ukraine. Anti-Ukrainian attitude persists among several Russian politicians, such as the former mayor of Moscow, Yuri Luzhkov, and the former leader of the Liberal Democratic Party of Russia and former Deputy Speaker of the Russian Parliament, Vladimir Zhirinovsky. Russian state officials have made anti-Ukrainian statements, for example, Deputy Chair of the Russian Security Council Dmitry Medvedev said in April 2022 that "the very essence of Ukrainianness, fed by anti-Russian venom and lies about its identity, is one big sham. Ukrainian identity does not exist and never has."

In 2006, in letters to Vladimir Putin, Viktor Yushchenko and Vasily Duma, the Ukrainian Cultural Centre of Bashkortostan complained of anti-Ukrainian sentiment in Russia, which they claim includes wide use of anti-Ukrainian ethnic slurs in the mainstream Russian media, television and film. The Urals Association of Ukrainians also made a similar complaint in a letter they addressed to the Organization for Security and Co-operation in Europe in 2000.

According to the Ukrainian Cultural Centre of Bashkortostan, despite their significant presence in Russia, Ukrainians in that country have less access to Ukrainian-language schools and Ukrainian churches than do other ethnic groups. In Vladivostok, according to the head of the Ukrainian government's department of Ukrainian Diaspora Affairs, local Russian officials banned a Ukrainian Sunday school in order not to "accentuate national issues".

According to the president of the Ukrainian World Congress in 2001, persistent requests to register a Ukrainian Orthodox Church – Kyiv Patriarchate or a Ukrainian Catholic Church were hampered due to "particular discrimination" against them, while other Catholic, Muslim, and Jewish denominations fared much better. According to the Ukrainian Greek Catholic Church, by 2007, their denomination had only one church building in all of Russia.

In 2008, Nikolai Smirnov released a documentary in which he claims that Ukraine is part of one whole Russia that was split away by various Western powers, particularly Poland.

In November 2010, the High Court of Russia cancelled registration of one of the biggest civic communities of the Ukrainian minority, the "Federal nation-cultural autonomy of the Ukrainians in Russia" (FNCAUR). According to the author, Mykhailo Ratushniy, Ukrainian activists continue to face discrimination and bigotry in much of Russia.

=== Poland ===
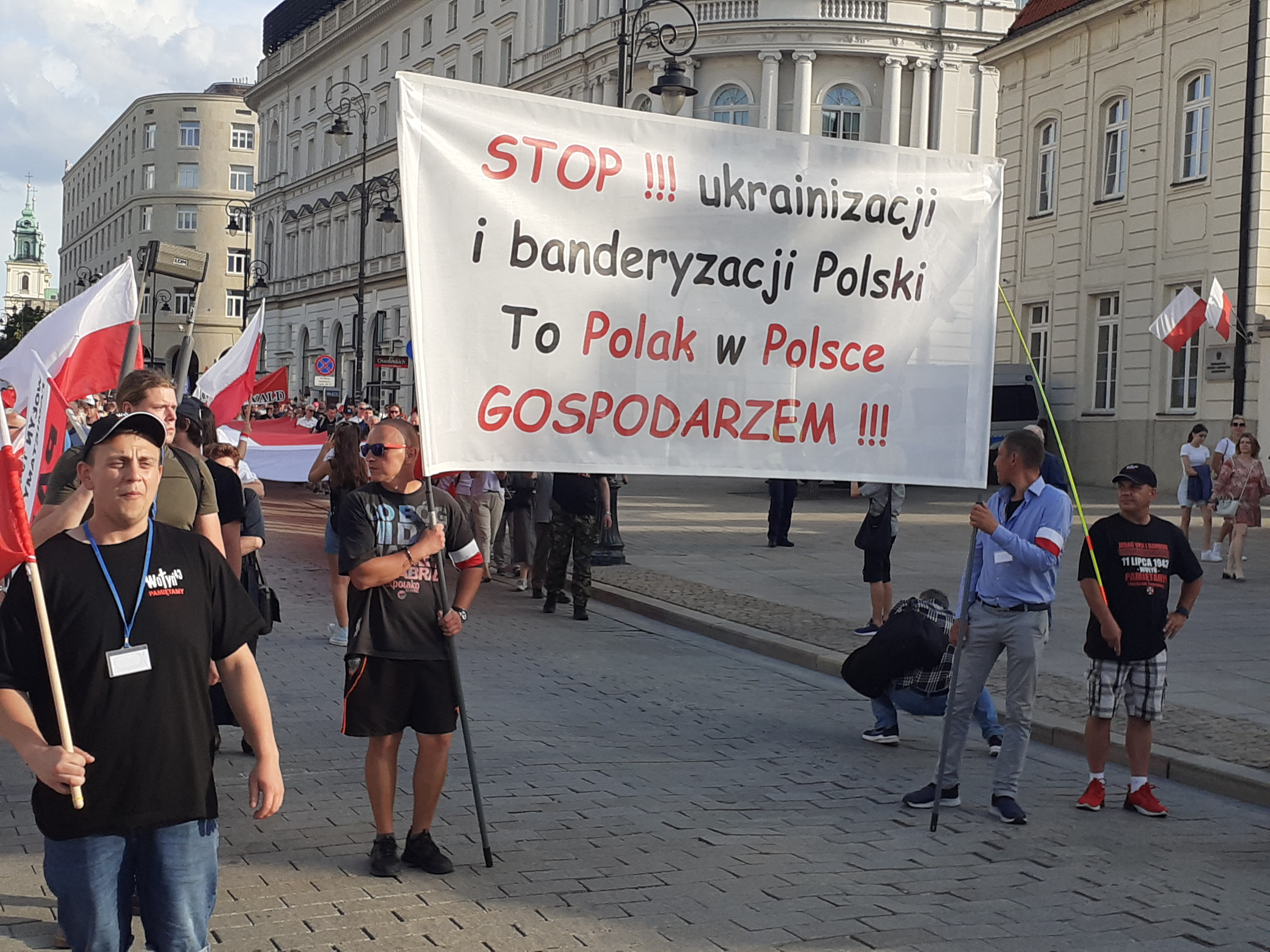
An anti-Ukrainian banner was carried at a march in Warsaw on the 80th anniversary of the Volhynia massacre in 2023

Polish anti-Ukrainian sentiment dates back to the Second World War, in which many ethnic Ukrainians in occupied Poland collaborated with the Germans as hilfswilliger and concentration camp guards. Ukrainian Auxiliary Police, armed militias such as the Ukrainian Insurgent Army, and military units such as the Dirlewanger Brigade and 14th Waffen Grenadier Division of the SS (1st Galician) rounded up Jews for deportation, committed atrocities against Polish civilians, and fought against the Home Army.

Under the Second Polish Republic, Ukrainians were routinely discriminated against (along with other minorities). They were excluded from public jobs, Polish peasants were favoured when land from nobles' estates was divided during land reform, and the Polish government went so far as to raze Orthodox churches and to plan the expulsion of all Ukrainians from the Kholm region. During the Second World War, some Ukrainians initially supported Soviet and German occupation over continued Polish rule. Polish and Ukrainian militant organisations fought an underground war during and after the German occupation. Many Poles consider the destruction of Polish villages and killing of civilians during the conflict as genocide of Poles, although Polish underground organisations also massacred Ukrainians (e.g. during the Pawlokoma massacre, which occurred after the Volhynia massacre).

In late 1995, Ukrainian organization "ZUwP" was demanded to be banned following the wave of anti-Ukrainian actions that have erupted during the festival of Ukrainian culture in Poland in the border town of Przemyśl in 1995 where numerous threats against participants and numerous acts of vandalism took place. A rise in incidences of graffiti with anti-Ukrainian slogans, and the office of "Związek Ukraińców w Polsce" was set alight. In some cities anti-Ukrainian assaults, vandalism acts of an organised character have targeted centres of Ukrainian culture, schools, churches, memorials.

Ukrainophobic and antisemitic authors (mainly interbellum Endecja activists) published by Polish publishing house Nortom include: Roman Dmowski, Janusz Dobrosz, Jędrzej Giertych, Jan Ludwik Popławski, Maciej Giertych, Stanisław Jastrzębski and Edward Prus. In 2000, Nortom was forced to withdraw its 12 controversial titles from the Frankfurt Book Fair by the Polish Ministry of Culture representative Andrzej Nowakowski overlooking the Polish exposition. Nortom was accused of selling anti-German, anti-Ukrainian and antisemitic books, especially the following titles: "Być czy nie być" by Stanisław Bełza, "Polska i Niemcy" by Jędrzej Giertych and "I tak nie przemogą. Antykościół, antypolonizm, masoneria" by his son Maciej Giertych. As a result of the above request, the president of the Polish delegation Andrzej Chrzanowski from Polska Izba Książki decided to penalise Nortom by removing it from the 2000 book fair altogether.

With the outbreak of the Russo-Ukrainian War in 2014, the number of Ukrainian people in Poland increased, especially those emigrating for work purposes, whose number began to grow in 2015. At that time, a stereotype of a Ukrainian as a cheap worker working illegally or as a person taking jobs from Poles in Poland emerged and increase in anti-immigrant sentiments by some political parties.

==== Situation after 24 February 2022 ====
24 February 2022, armed forces of the Russian Federation invaded Ukraine. As a result, by November 2023, over 17 million Ukrainian citizens had crossed the Polish-Ukrainian border. The government and Polish society decided to help Ukraine, but the situation caused by the Ukrainian refugee crisis also resulted in a negative attitude towards Ukrainians among some Poles. Politicians Grzegorz Braun and Janusz Korwin-Mikke are often associated with anti-Ukrainian statements along with the Confederation Liberty and Independence party. There were critical voices regarding aid for Ukraine and the alleged disarmament of the Polish Army from which newly purchased equipment was supposed to be sent to Ukraine. While some of these votes were right, some of them were mainly related to Russian propaganda. In 2022 the hashtag #StopUkrainizacjiPolski (Stop the ukrainization of Poland) was popularized. Anti-Ukrainian sentiments were not only related to economic topics and war, but also appeared with various incidents such as the murder on Nowy Świat street in Warsaw in May 2022, for which a Ukrainian citizen was allegedly responsible, or the missile explosion incident in Przewodów. A few smaller incidents also sparked anti-Ukrainian sentiments, but in some incidents some media incorrectly attributed Ukrainian nationality to the welders an example of which is the situation with 2 May 2023 when during the Polish Cup final in Warsaw a man who attacked police officers with an ax was wrongly presented as a Ukrainian citizen, even though he was a Polish citizen.

Recently, the most negative feelings among Polish society have been aroused by military support for Ukraine, which is defined as the transfer of military equipment and some necessary logistic supplies for free, and the problem related to Ukrainian grain, which caused farmers' protests on the Polish-Ukrainian border related to the massive flooding of the market with Ukrainian grain, lowering local prices.

In 2026, during the 2026 Poland–Ukraine diplomatic crisis, the Polish government stripped Volodymyr Zelenskyy of the Order of the White Eagle for naming a military unit after the collaborationist Ukrainian Insurgent Army.

=== Portugal ===
Anti-Ukrainian sentiment in Portugal has grown since the arrival of Ukrainian immigrants to Portuguese territory in the 1990s. Most Ukrainians in Portugal work in low-skill and low wages jobs, particularly on cleaning services, construction, manufacturing industries, transport services, hotels and restaurants. In March 2020, a Ukrainian citizen named Ihor Humenyuk was interrogated and tortured to death at Lisbon airport while trying to immigrate to Portugal irregularly.

=== Canada ===
Anti-Ukrainian discrimination was present in Canada from the arrival of Ukrainians in Canada around 1891 until the late 20th century. In one sense this was part of a larger trend towards nativism in Canada during the period. But Ukrainians were singled out for special discrimination because of their large numbers, visibility (due to dress, non-western European appearance, and language), and political activism. During the First World War, around 8,000 Ukrainian Canadians were interned by the Canadian government as "enemy aliens" (because they came from the Austrian Empire). In the interwar period all Ukrainian cultural and political groups, no matter what their ideology was, were monitored by the Royal Canadian Mounted Police and many of their leaders were deported.

This attitude began to slowly change after the Second World War, as Canadian immigration and cultural policies generally moved from being explicitly nativist to a more pluralistic one. Ukrainian nationalists were now seen as victims of communism, rather than dangerous subversives. Ukrainians began to hold high offices, and one, Senator Paul Yuzyk was one of the earliest proponents of a policy of "multiculturalism" which would end official discrimination and acknowledge the contribution of non-English, non-French Canadians. The Royal Commission on Bilingualism and Biculturalism of the 1960s, which had originally been formed only to deal with French-Canadian grievances, began the transition to multiculturalism in Canada because of Prime Minister Pierre Trudeau's desire to court Ukrainian votes in Western Canada. The commission also included a Ukrainian Canadian commissioner, Jaroslav Rudnyckyj.

Since the adoption of official multiculturalism under Section Twenty-seven of the Canadian Charter of Rights and Freedoms in 1982, Ukrainians in Canada have had legal protection against discrimination. Ukrainian Canadians have held high offices including Governor General (Ray Hnatyshyn), Deputy Prime Minister (Chrystia Freeland), Leader of the Opposition (Rona Ambrose), and several premiers of provinces.

=== Latvia ===
According to researcher Mārtiņš Kaprāns of Center for European Policy Analysis, disinformation about Ukraine is dominant in Latvia's pro-Kremlin and Russian language media, which has contributed to a negative image of Ukraine in its Russian-speaking population, while ethnic Latvians are largely supportive of Ukraine. He has named Tatjana Ždanoka, Alexander Gaponenko and vesti.lv as some of the sources of anti-Ukrainian statements in Latvia.

On 20 May 2022, a man in Riga was ordered to pay 6034.55 euros as material and moral damages and sentenced to 200 hours of community service for attacking a young man with a flag of Ukraine on his shoulders. A police officer and an alleged spouse of the attacker present at the moment of the attack was fired from the State Police for negligence. On 24 June 2022, a criminal case was launched against two young people for burning a flag of Ukraine at Vērmane Garden with the intention of posting the video on TikTok to gain popularity and provoke Ukrainians.

=== North Korea ===
On 23 June 2024, Pak Jong-chon made a statement in which he compares Ukrainians to neo-Nazis.

== Slang references to Ukrainians and Ukrainian culture ==
The use of ethnic slurs and stereotypes in relation to Ukrainians in Russian media is one of Ukrainian community's concerns in Russia.

=== Ethnic slurs ===
- khokhol – derived from a term for a traditional Cossack-style haircut.
- saloyed – literally "salo eater"; based on a stereotype and a running joke that salo is a national food favorite of the Ukrainians.
- Ukr, plural Ukry – after gaining independence, Ukrainians started rebuilding their history after a long period of Polonization and Russification. This nation-building drive was derided by Russians. A Russian running joke is that Ukrainians derive the name of the country Ukraine from the name of the supposed ancient tribe of "Ukrs". Also derisively called Great Ukrs, Velikiie Ukry.
- Ukrop – literally "dill", a pun: Ukrainian = ukrop. The slur was reappropriated by Ukrainians during the war in Donbas and later adopted by the UKROP party.
- Szoszon – in Poland, an imitation of the Polish word "Co"?, literally "what?" - Ukrainians struggle to pronounce "Co?" And instead say the word "Szo?" -, and a pun on the Shoshone tribe of North America.
- Hunky – in North America (historically)

=== Political insults and historical nicknames ===
- Maloross – Ukrainian, "Little Russian", "dweller of Malorossiya". Revival of a nineteenth-century imperial Russian term dismissive of independent Ukrainian nationality. Ukrainians often use this to describe culturally russified Ukrainians.

There are a number of Russian insults based on the alleged opposition of all Ukrainians to all things Russian (or all things Soviet, in the past):

- Mazepinets – Mazepite, Ivan Mazepa supporter, archaic.
- Pietliurovets – Petlyurite, Symon Petliura supporter.
- Banderivets, or Banderovets, also variants Bandera, Banderlog, Benderovets. – "Banderite", a term used to associate Ukrainian national identity with radical nationalism. Historically, referred to supporters of far-right nationalist politician Stepan Bandera (1909–59).
- Zhydobandera, Zhidobandera, or Zhydobanderovets – "Yid-Banderite" or "Judeo-Banderite" a conflation of Zhyd (i.e., a Kike) and a Bandera follower. This is an ironic self-appellation coined by Ukrainian Jewish activists during the Euromaidan protests to highlight the inconsistency of Russian propaganda which demonized Ukrainian pro-Europe and pro-democracy activism as fascist to the West and as Jewish to Ukrainians, with reference to "Judeo-Bolshevism".
- Maidaun – a conflation of the Maidan protest movement and daun, person with Down syndrome.
- Maidanutyi – a conflation of the Maidan and the yebanutyi, "fucked in the head" (insane).
- kastruliegolovyi – literally "cooking pot-headed". A derogatory term for Euromaidan supporters. So-called "Dictatorship laws" banned, among other things, the use of helmets during mass gatherings. On 19 January 2014 some Euromaidan participants mocked the ban by wearing cookware as helmets.
- svidomit – a conflation of Ukrainian svidomyi, "conscious, conscientious", and Russian sodomit, "sodomite".
- Banderlog – a conflation of Bandera and Bandar-log.
- Pigs – refers to a stereotype that Ukrainians love to eat salo and pork in general.

=== Other ===
- mova – a Russian derisive slang reference to Ukrainian language ("language" is mova in Ukrainian, yazyk in Russian).
- nezalezhnaya – a Russian derisive slang reference to Ukraine. Borrowing of Ukrainian nezalezhna, "independent", with a Russian ending, mocking the historical Ukrainian struggle for independence (compare Russian nezavisimaya). Sometimes used colloquially by Russians and Russian mass media to express ironic, disparaging attitude towards Ukraine.

== Anti-Ukrainian sentiment in culture and media ==
- 72 Meters
- Brother 2
- Taras Bulba
- Iron Ivan
- Everything Is Illuminated
- Crimea. The Way Home
- The Game
- My Fair Nanny
- ru:20/22
- Ukraine on Fire
- Hatred
- Emily in Paris
- Lost Girl
- 2 Broke Girls
- Lord of War
- The White Guard
- The Days of the Turbins
- Battle for Sevastopol
- Gogol. The Beginning
- Viy
- Trotsky
- Interns
- Black Hunters 2
- The Grishchenko family

== See also ==
- Chronology of Ukrainian language bans
- Russification of Ukraine
- Slavophobia
- Dziuba, Ivan, Internationalism or Russification?, a dissident's Marxist critique of the national and cultural policy of the Soviet Union in the Ukrainian Soviet Socialist Republic
- "What Russia should do with Ukraine"
- Russian allegations of fascism against Ukraine
