= Woods of Terror =

Theme park in North Carolina, United States

- Location in North Carolina
- Location: Greensboro, North Carolina, United States
- Coordinates: 36°11′48.932″N 79°47′4.897″W
- Status: Operating
- Opened: 1991
- Owner: McLaurin Farms
- Operated by: Eddie H. McLaurin
- Area: 45 acres (18 ha)
- Website: woodsofterror.com

Woods of Terror is a haunted house theme park located in Greensboro, North Carolina.

== History ==
Woods of Terror sits on 45 acres of land 12 miles outside of Greensboro, North Carolina. The land is said to be the permanent home to countless spirits who died during The Great Depression. At the time, local priest, Father Eddie Howie McMillan, was the owner of the land. He passed it on to his great-grandson, Eddie Howie McLaurin, in 1970. It became known as McLaurin Farms. McLaurin used the area as a junkyard, collecting fees from individuals who dumped their unwanted belongings, ranging from refrigerators to cars. These items remain as a part of the set used by Woods of Terror. The park opened in 1991.

== Attractions ==
Woods of Terror offers a variety of attractions. Just beyond the ticket booth is The Monster Midway, which is the waiting area of Woods of Terror. When he is in the midway, Eddie McLaurin is known as "Bone Daddy" and wears a red mohawk and half-skeleton face makeup. Bone Daddy leads a monster parade and sings the national anthem in a punk rock style accompanied by fireworks and a band. In the midway, there are refreshments and photo opportunities with Bone Daddy and his 80-pound albino Burmese python, Dawn.

Additional attractions include Arachnophobia, designed to exploit fears of spiders, roaches, and snakes, and Chaos 3D, where guests get close to three-dimensional murals, wear 3D glasses and explore halls filled with visual illusions. Other experiences include Industrial Nightmare, The Blood House, Horror Movie Classics, The Awakening, Miner's Massacre, The Slaughter House, and The Purge Anarchy. Approximately 175 employees work at Woods of Terror each year.

== McLaurin Farms ==
In addition to Woods of Terror, McLaurin Farms has a large pumpkin patch during autumn, and Christmas lights set to music and hayrides in the winter. In the spring, the site has an annual Easter egg hunt along with face painting.
