= On the Independence of Ukraine =

Russian poem by Joseph Brodsky

"On the Independence of Ukraine" (Russian: На независимость Украины, romanized: Na nezavisimost Ukrainy) is a controversial Ukrainophobic poem by Joseph Brodsky written in the early 1990s, on the occasion of the 1991 Declaration of Independence of Ukraine and the subsequent dissolution of the Soviet Union.

In the poem, Brodsky, in angry and insulting words expressed his contempt for Ukrainian independence, presented as ungrateful departure from Russia. He refers to Ukrainians as, among other things, khokhly (a Russian ethnic slur for Ukrainians), vertukhais (prison guards) and Cossacks. In the poem's final lines, he states that independence-minded Ukrainians will, on their deathbed, abandon their love of poet Taras Shevchenko (considered the father of Ukrainian literature), and instead embrace poet Alexander Pushkin (considered the father of Russian literature):

With God, eagles, Cossacks, hetmans, and vertukhais!

Only when it's your turn to die, you scoundrels, you'll be gasping, scratching the edge of the mattress,

for lines by Alexander, not the nonsense of Taras!

The poem was never officially published. Brodsky himself is known to have read the poem in public only a few times, including at the Palo Alto Jewish community center on October 30, 1992. Known only from private manuscripts, it began to receive publicity after it was published in 1994 by Ukrainian nationalists as a demonstration of Brodsky's Russian nationalist views.

For some time, the authorship of the poem was disputed due to striking differences in style, e.g., by human rights activist Alexander Daniel who pointed out "surprisingly poor style" of the poem, but later retracted from his analysis, when presented with "statements from reliable witnesses" who saw Brodsky's reading of the poem. In 2015, a video of Brodsky's 1992 public reading of the poem was posted on Facebook by a user named Boris Vladimirsky. This constituted sufficient proof for Daniel and others that the poem was indeed Brodsky's.

In 2015, on the peak of the war in Donbas, Russian media further popularized the poem.
