= Mohawk hairstyle =

Hairstyle

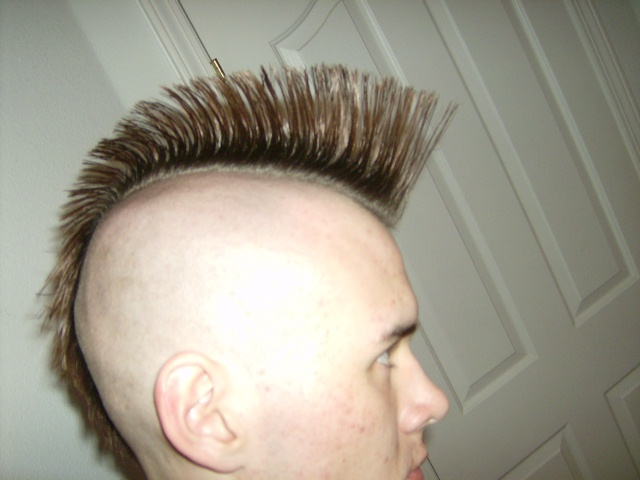
A young man wearing a mohawk

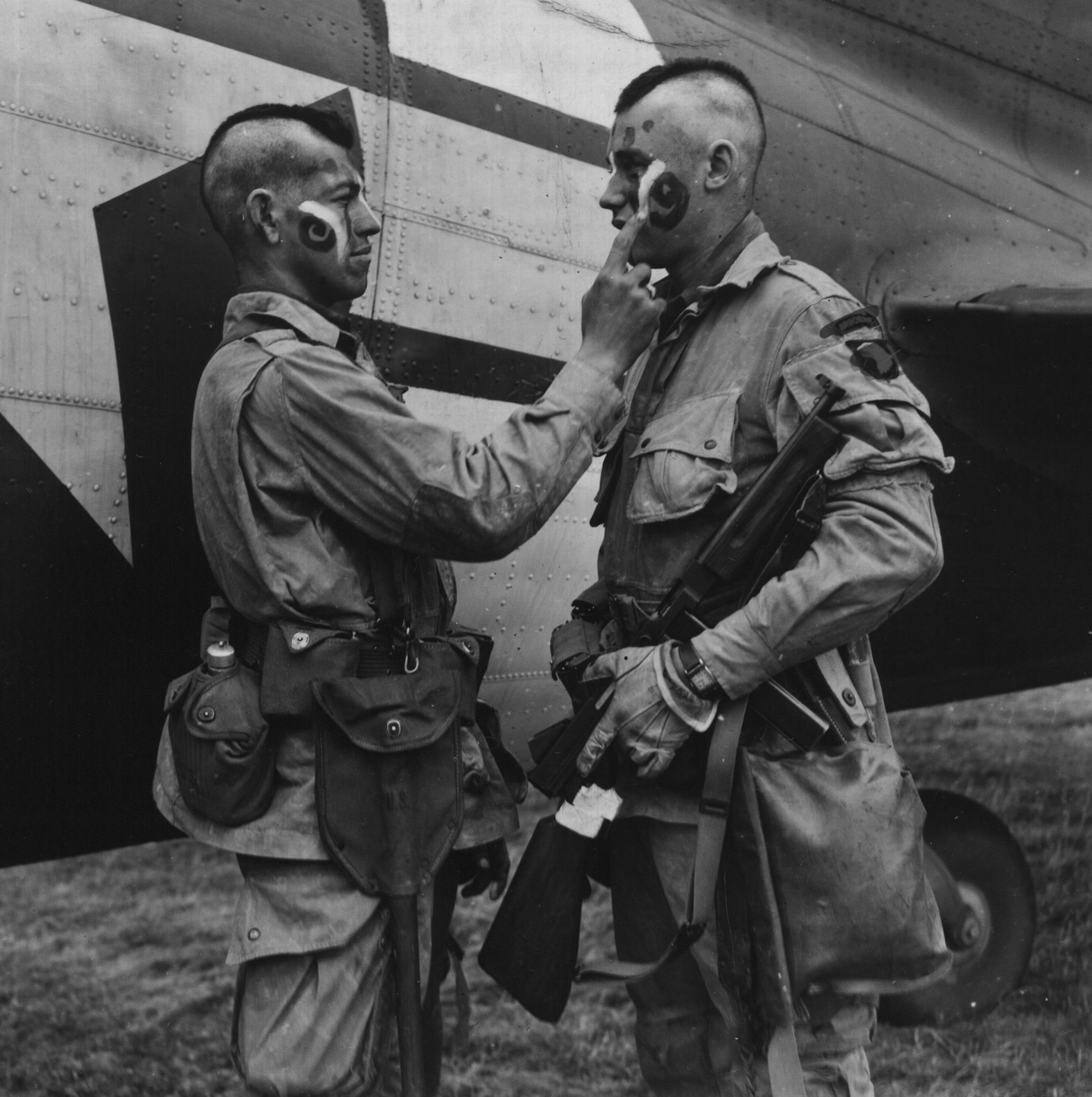
Paratroopers of the 101st Airborne Division in 1944

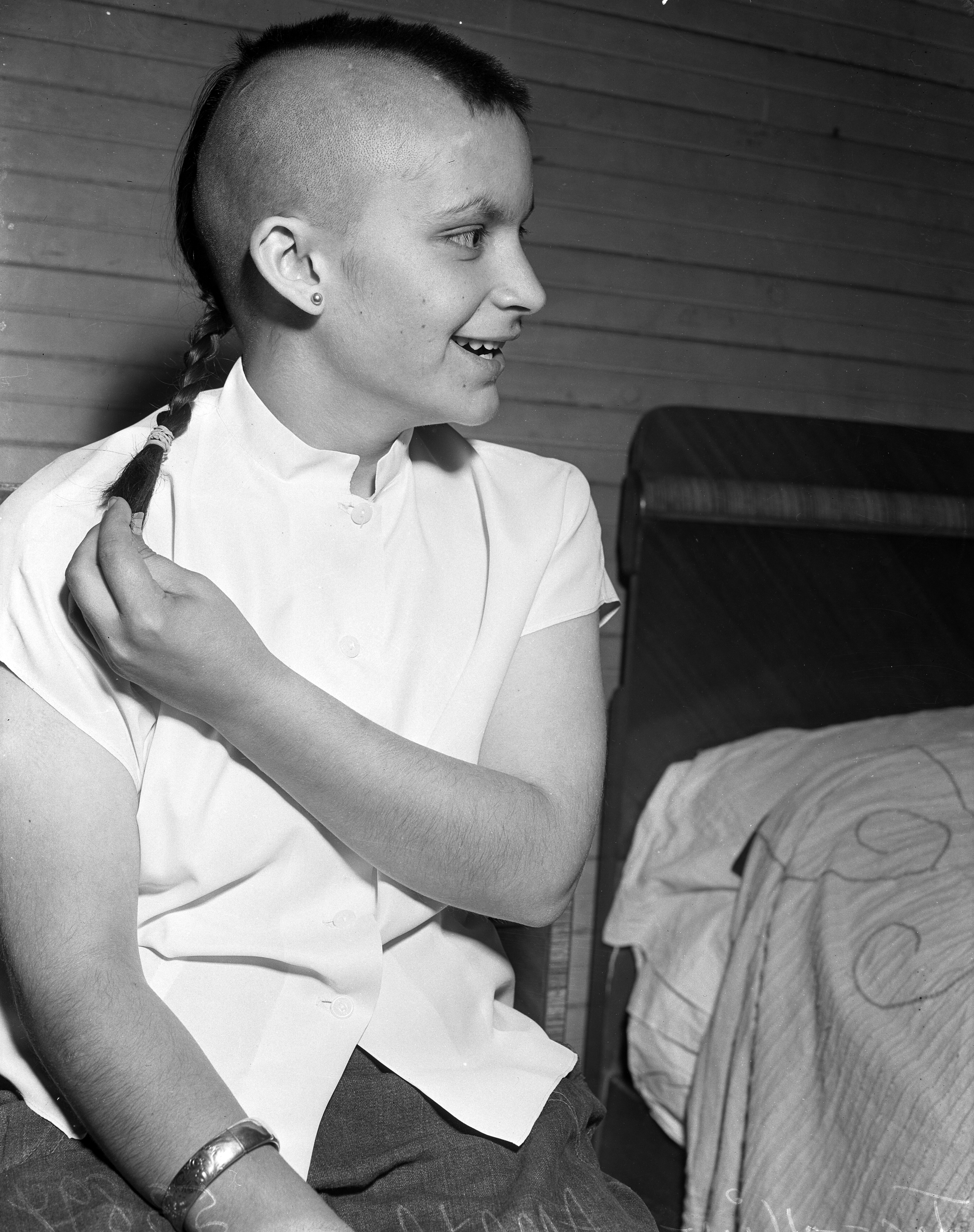
Girl with rattail mohawk, 1951

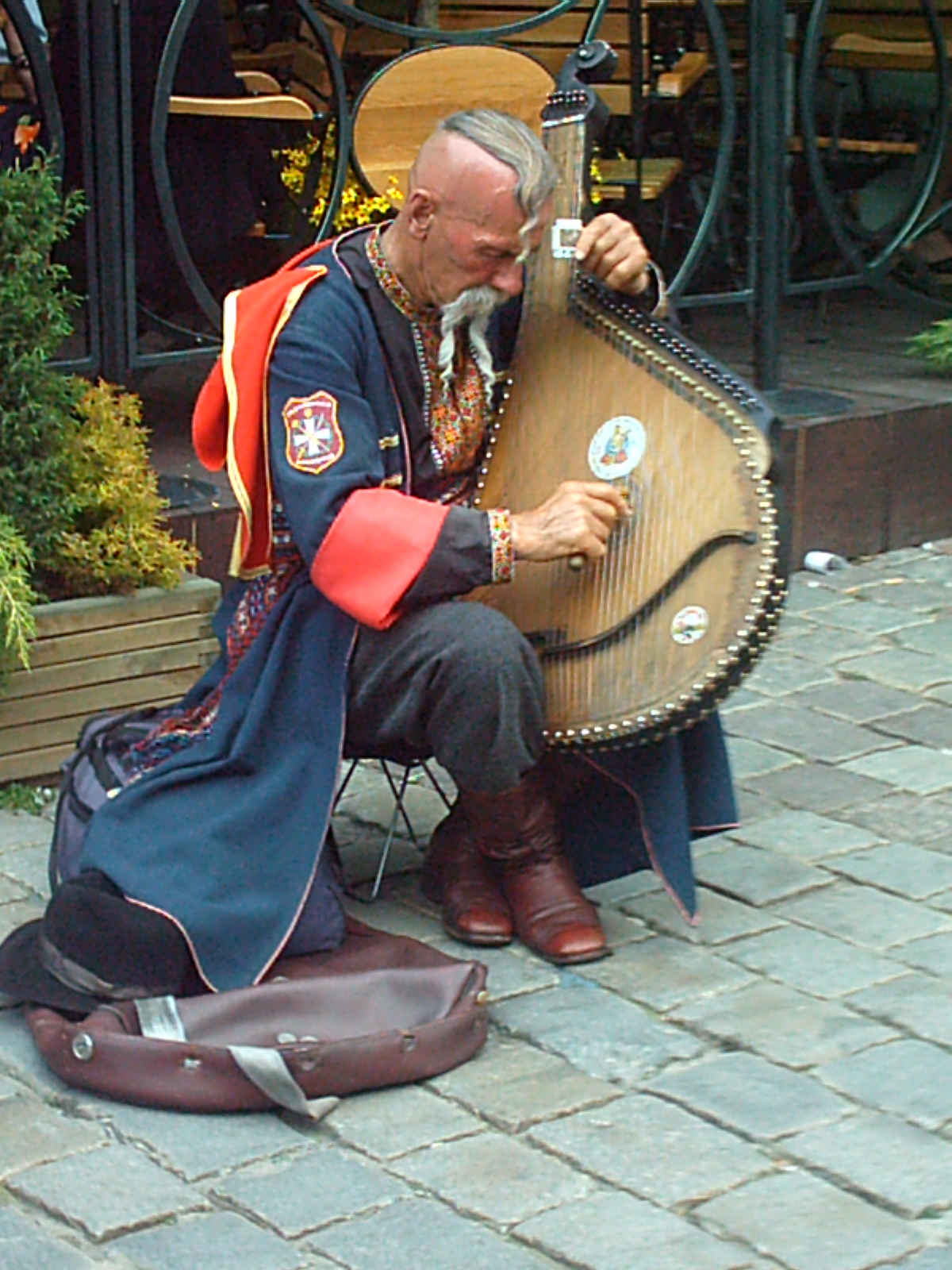
Ukrainian Cossack musician with chupryna or oseledets

The mohawk (also referred to as a mohican in British English) is a hairstyle in which, in the most common variety, both sides of the head are shaven, leaving a strip of noticeably longer hair in the center. Mohawk hairstyles have existed for thousands of years. As of the 21st century, they are most commonly associated with punks, or broader non-conformity.

The mohawk is also sometimes referred to as an iro in reference to the Iroquois, who include the Mohawk people from whom the hairstyle is supposedly derived, though historically the hair was plucked out, rather than shaved. Additionally, hairstyles bearing these names more closely resemble those worn by the Pawnee, rather than the Mohawk, Mohicans, Mohegan, or other groups whose names are phonetically similar.

The world record for the tallest full mohawk goes to Joseph Grisamore, also known as the Mohawk King, who has a 108-centimetre (3 ft 6 1/2 in) tall mohawk, while the world record for the tallest mohican hairstyle goes to Kazuhiro Watanabe, who has a 113.5-centimetre (3 ft 8 1/2 in) tall mohawk.

== Etymology ==
While the mohawk hairstyle takes its name from the people of the Mohawk nation, an indigenous people of North America who originally inhabited the Mohawk Valley in Upstate New York, the association comes from Hollywood and more specifically from the popular 1939 film Drums Along the Mohawk starring Henry Fonda. The Mohawk and the rest of the Haudenosaunee (Iroquois) Confederacy (Seneca, Cayuga, Onondaga, Tuscarora, and Oneida) in fact wore a square of hair on the back of the crown of the head. The Mohawk did not shave their heads when they created this square of hair, but they rather pulled the hair out in small tufts at a time. The following is a first-hand account of James Smith, who was captured during the French and Indian War and adopted into the Mohawk tribe:

[A] number of Indians collected about me and one of them began to pull hair out of my head. He had some ashes on a piece of bark in which he frequently dipped his fingers in order to take a firmer hold, and so he went on as if he had been plucking a turkey until he had all the hair clean out of my head, except a small spot about three or four inches square on my crown the remaining hair was cut and three braids formed which were decorated.

Therefore, a true hairstyle of the Mohawks was one of plucked-out hair, leaving a three-inch square of hair on the back crown of the head with three short braids of hair decorated. The three braids of a True Mohawk hairstyle are represented today on traditional headdresses of the Mohawk known as a Gustoweh. Mohawk Gustowehs have three upright eagle feathers that represent the three braids of long ago. When not decorated, the very short braids were allowed to hang loose as seen in Good Peter's image in the referenced article.

The name Mohican is more common in the UK, popularized by the use of the style in the 1971 BBC adaptation of The Last of the Mohicans, but in that show, it was actually worn by characters representing the Huron people.

== Historical use ==
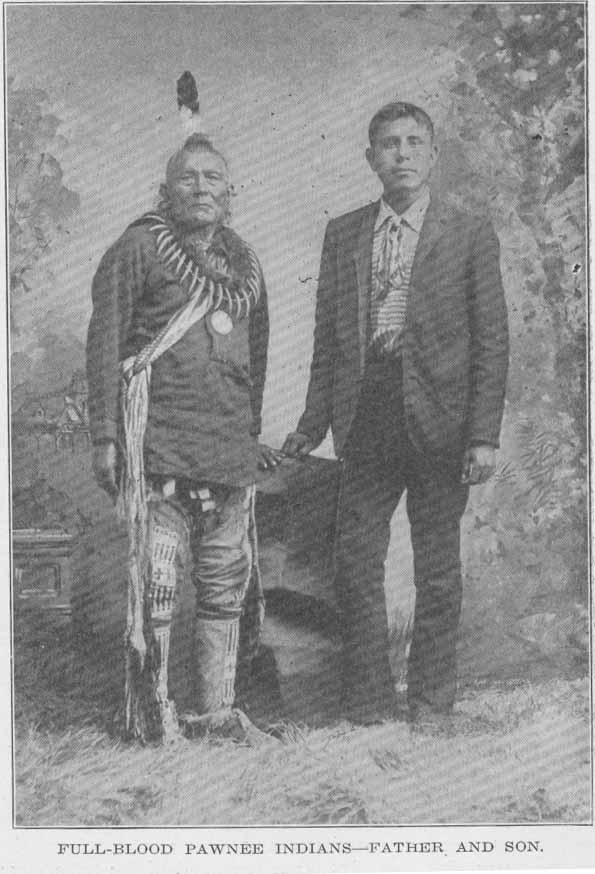
Pawnee father and son, 1912; note the father's hairstyle similar to a modern mohawk

The hairstyle has been in existence in many parts of the world for millennia. Herodotus stated that the Macai, a tribe in northern Libya, "shave their hair so as to leave tufts, letting the middle of their hair grow long, but round this on all sides shaving it close to the skin."

Among the Pawnee people, who historically lived in present-day Nebraska and northern Kansas, a "mohawk" hairstyle was common.

When going to war, the 16th-century Ukrainian Cossacks would shave their heads, leaving a long central strip. This haircut was known as an oseledets or chupryna, and was often braided or tied in a topknot.

During World War II, many American GIs, notably paratroopers from the 17th Airborne Division and 101st Airborne Division, wore mohawks to intimidate their enemies. It was also occasionally worn by American troops during the Vietnam War. In the early 1950s, mohawks were worn by some jazz musicians such as Sonny Rollins, and in the 1970s, people in the punk subculture wore mohawks.

== Varieties ==
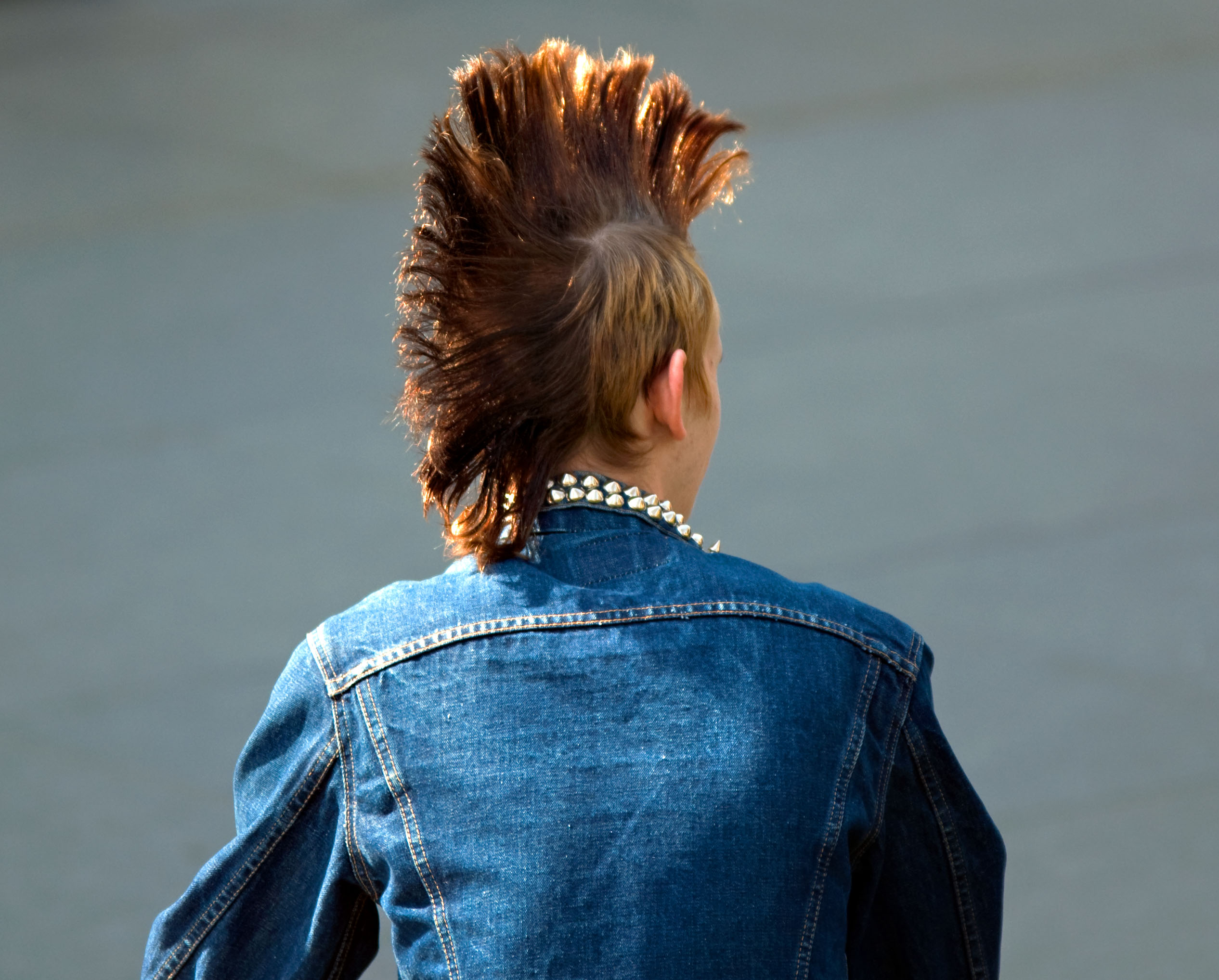
British punk with euro‑hawk

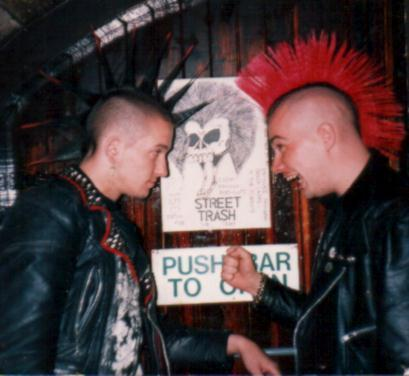
English punk with spike Mohawk

Although a mohawk is most widely defined as a narrow, central strip of upright hair running from the forehead to the nape, with the sides of the head bald, the term can be applied more loosely to various similar hairstyles, many of which have informal names.

- A reverse mohawk, also known as a nohawk or hawkmo, rather than the strip of longer hair in the center of the scalp, features a shaved strip from the forehead to the nape of the neck leaving hair on either side of the line. Pioneering examples were sported by the American professional wrestler Road Warrior Hawk and the English rock singer Peter Gabriel whilst on tour with progressive rock band Genesis in 1973.

- A fauxhawk copies the style of a mohawk but without shaving the sides of the head and not extending past the peak of the cranium. The fauxhawk is typically worn with a small but noticeable spike in the middle, but it is usually considerably shorter than many traditional mohawks. The style re-emerged in the 2000s, with some of the popularly known wearers being Travis vocalist Fran Healy, David Beckham, Elijah Wood, and Jónsi. The fauxhawk is also known as the "Hoxton fin" after the Hoxton district of London, where it was fashionable in the 1990s.
- A euro-hawk is a fauxhawk where the hair down the center of the head is longer than the hair on the sides. Sometimes the top of the hair is long enough to cover up the shorter sides when combed down. Some sports figures and fashion models can be found wearing euro-hawks in various lengths, textures, and colors. The mohawk had been a style mostly seen on punk rockers and the like, but fauxhawks and euro-hawks have become more broadly popular. The ponyhawk or pony hawk is a type of euro-hawk created by a row of ponytails going down the middle of the head. This look was worn by contestant Sanjaya Malakar on an episode of the television series American Idol.
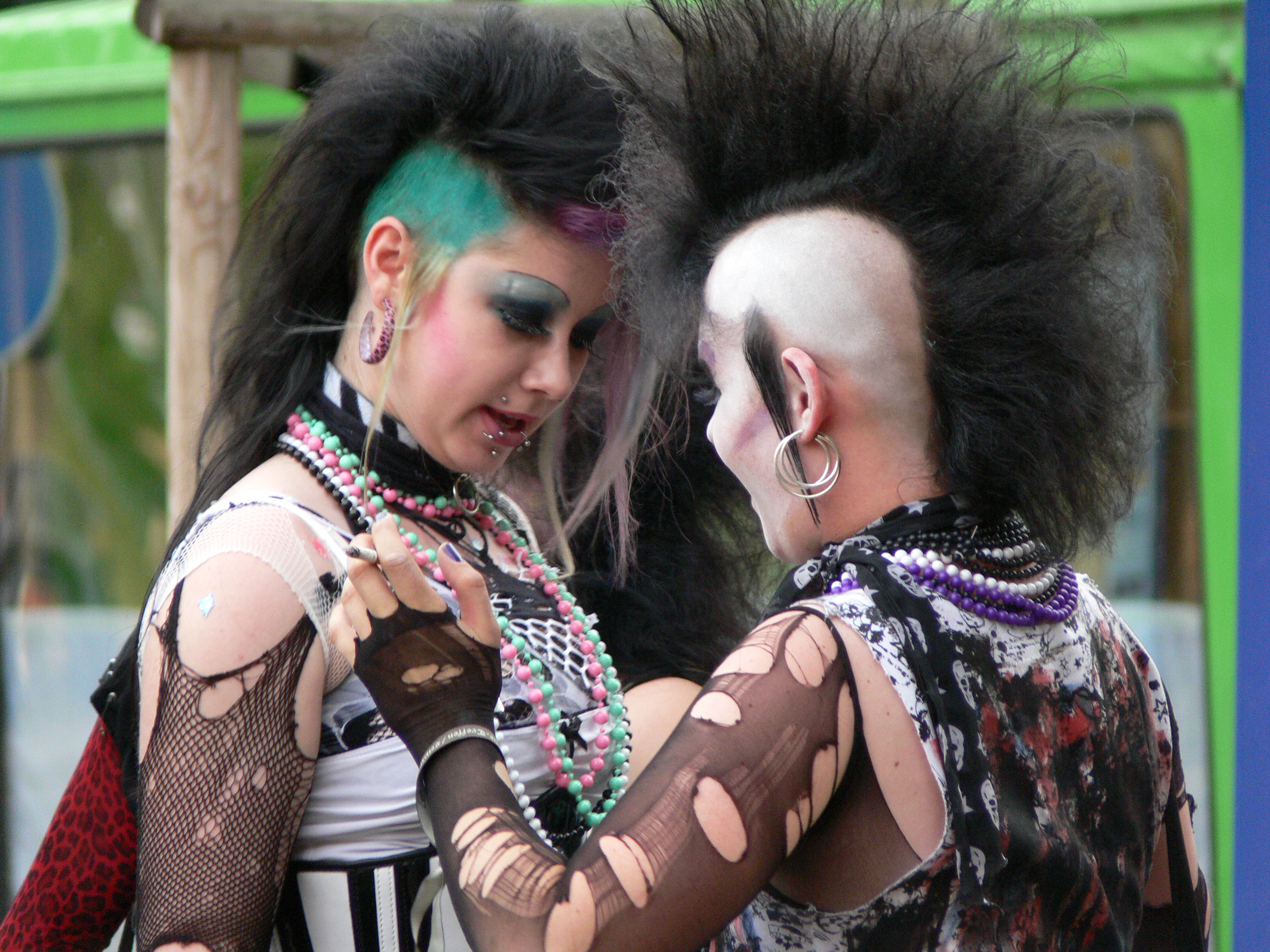
Two goths with backcombed deathhawks

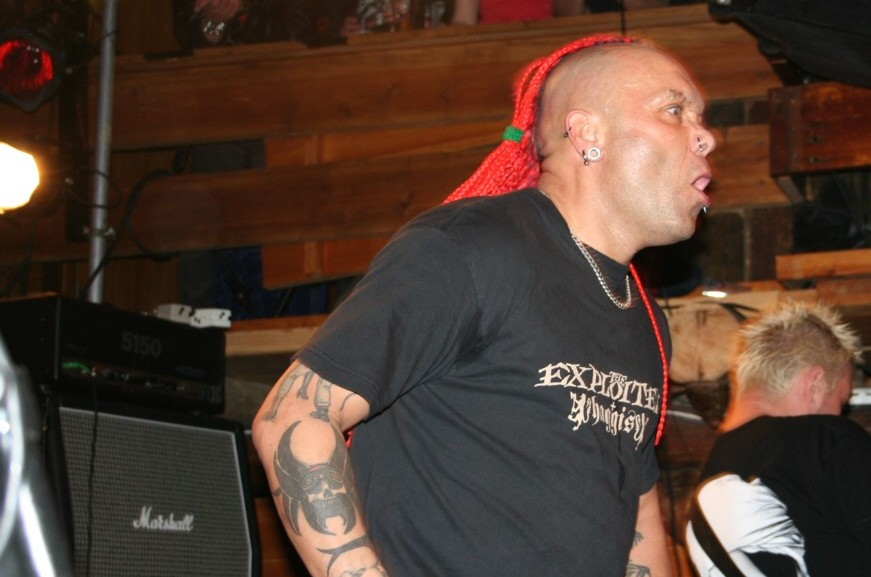
Wattie Buchan of the Scottish punk rock band The Exploited sporting a dreadhawk

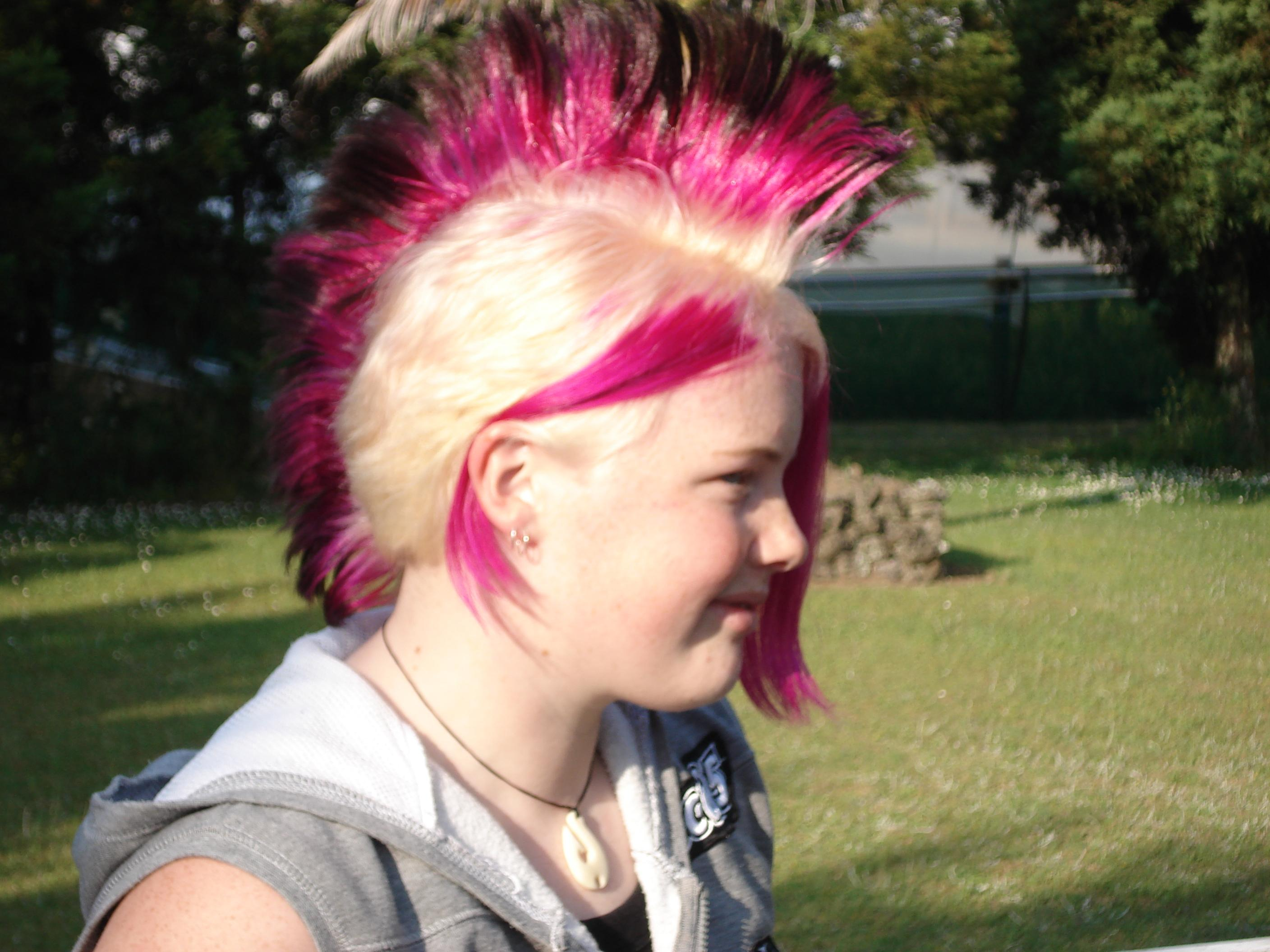
A Chelsea hawk

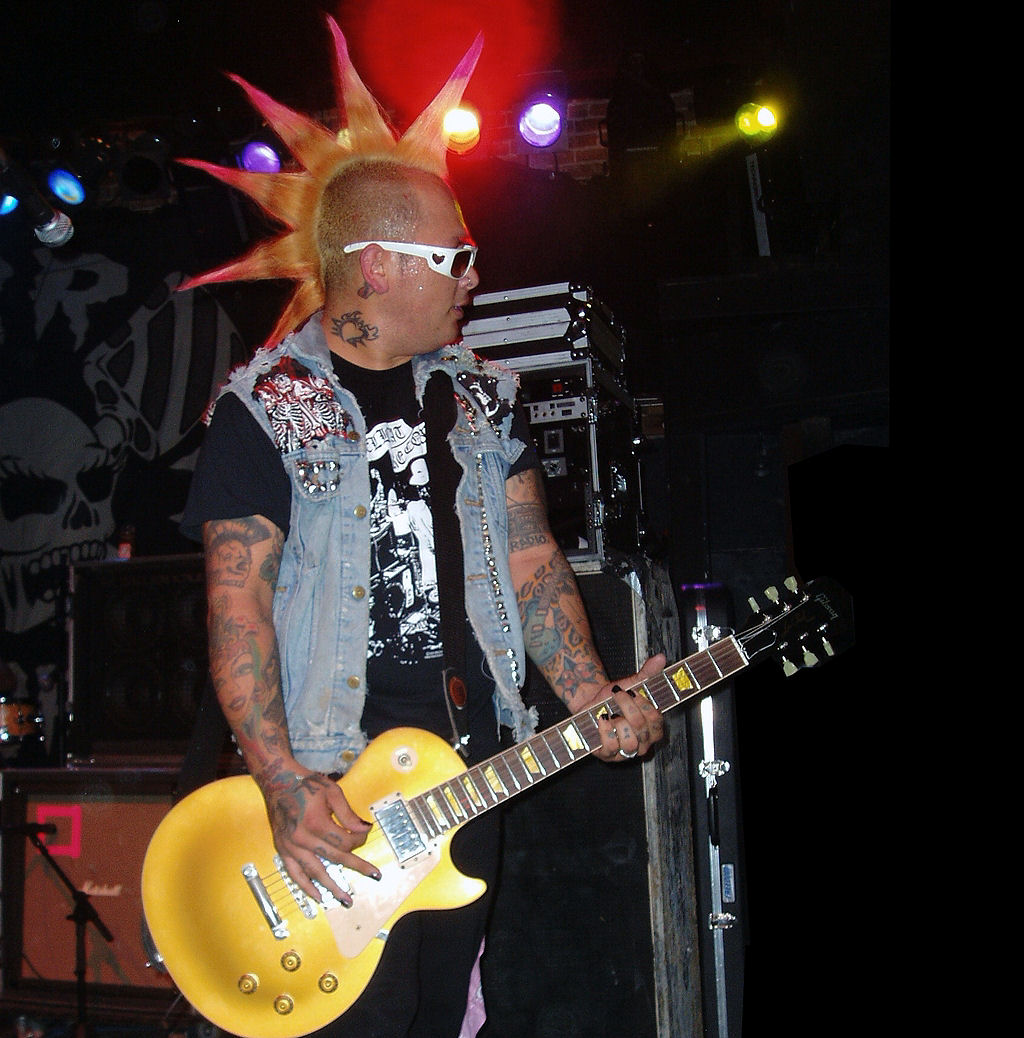
Left Alone vocalist Elvis Cortez with a liberty spike mohawk

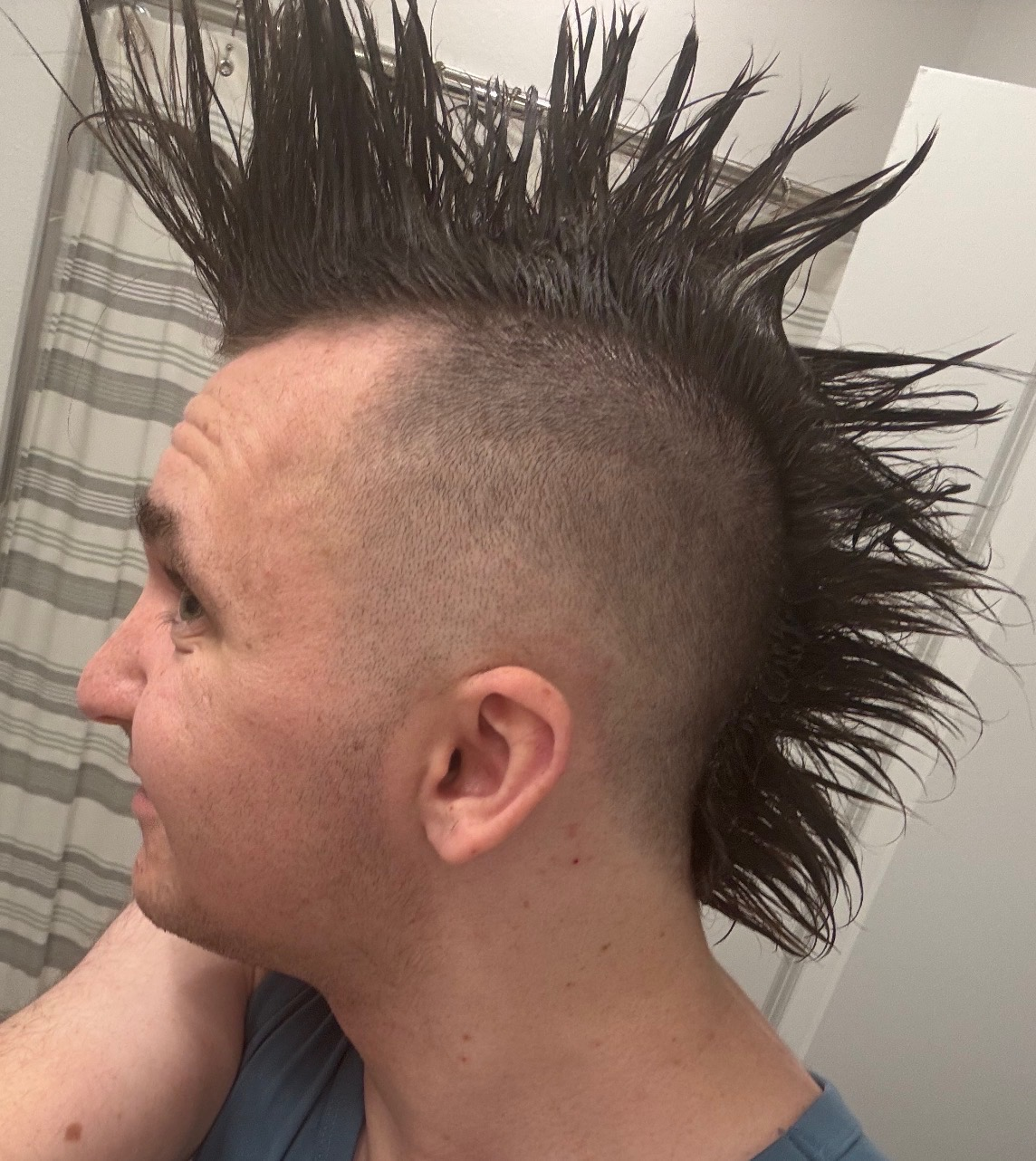
A young man with a spike mohawk and a skin fade

== Notable people ==
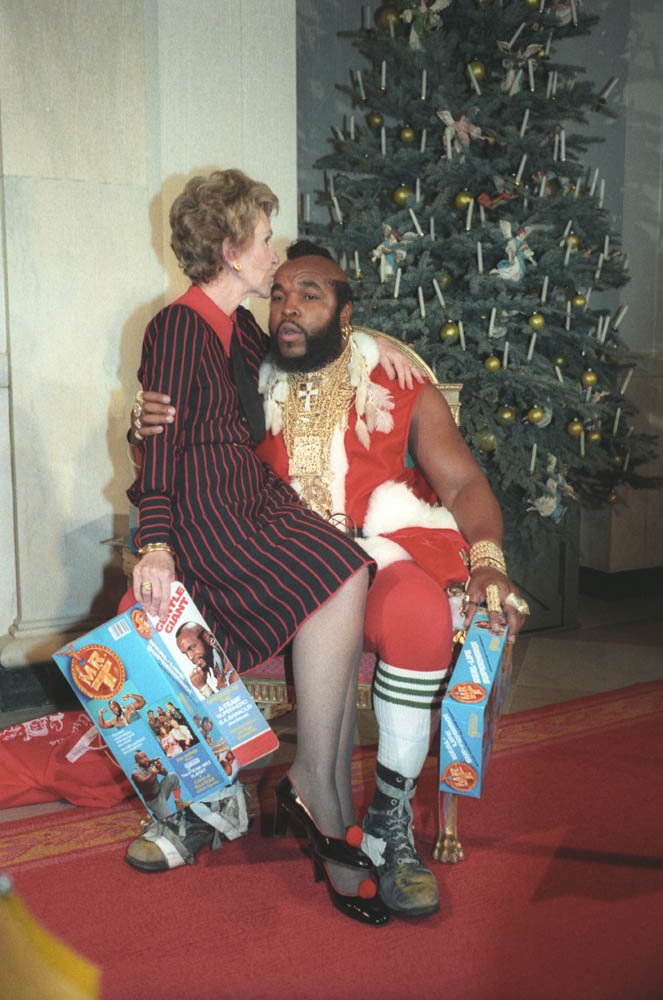
Mr. T portraying Santa Claus at the White House with First Lady Nancy Reagan in 1983

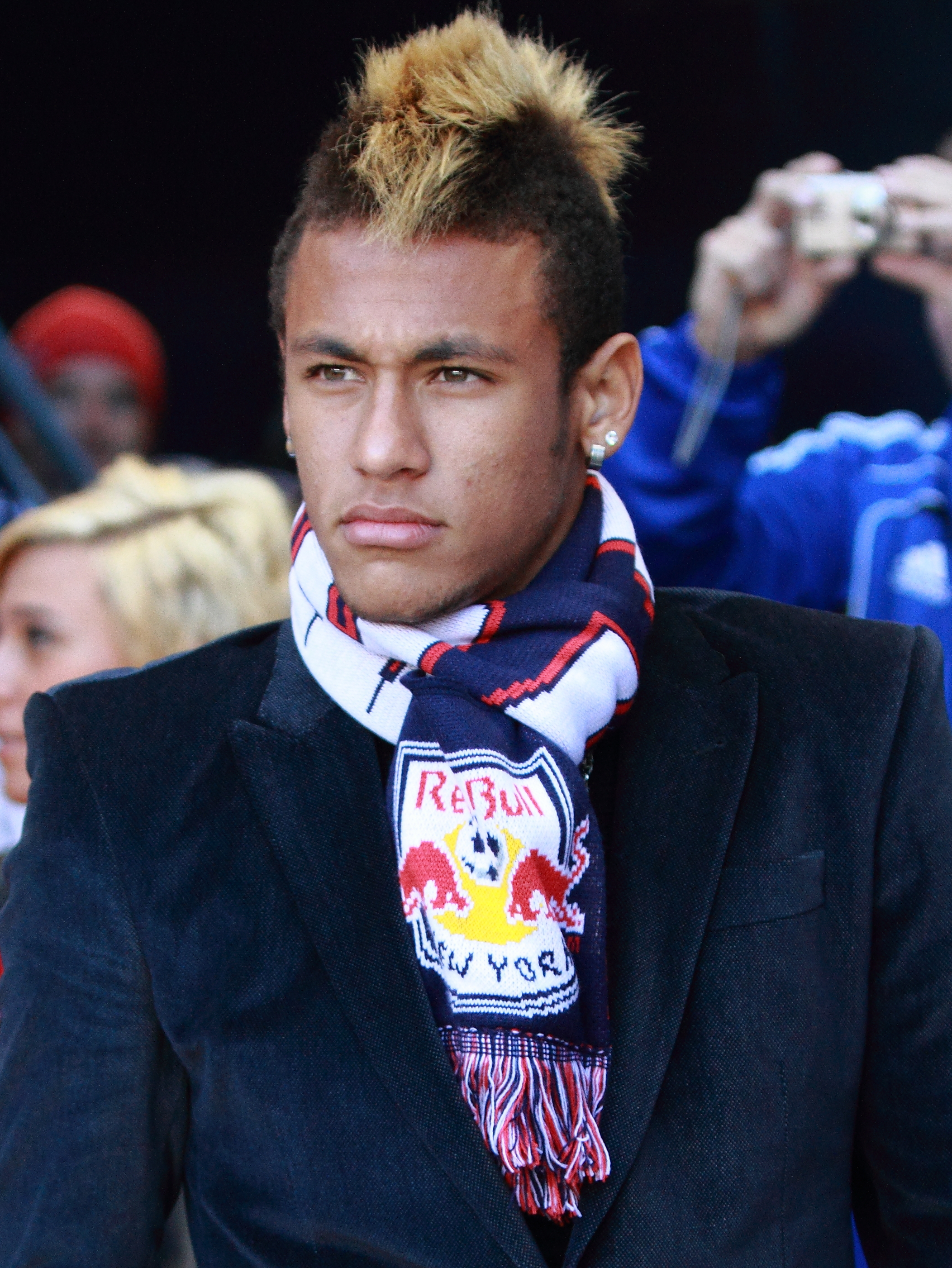
Brazilian footballer Neymar with a mohawk hairstyle

- Richie Stotts (born 1953), American singer-songwriter, guitarist, and producer
- Jean Beauvoir, American singer-songwriter, bassist, guitarist, and producer
- Gabriel Boric (born 1986), President of Chile
- Joakim Brodén (born 1980), Swedish musician
- Wattie Buchan (born 1957), Scottish punk rock vocalist and frontman for Scottish punk band The Exploited
- Darby Crash (1958–1980), American punk rock vocalist and frontman for The Germs
- Bobak Ferdowsi (born 1979), flight engineer at NASA Jet Propulsion Laboratory
- Andy Kaufman (1949–1984), American entertainer and performance artist
- Kevin Nash (born 1959), American actor and former professional wrestler
- Trot Nixon (born 1974), American former baseball player
- Jonathan Papelbon (born 1980), American MLB pitcher
- Glen Plake (born 1964), American extreme skier
- Scot Pollard (born 1975), American NBA basketball player
- Sanada (born 1988), Japanese professional wrestler
- Catya Sassoon (1968–2002), American actress, singer, and model
- Michelle Shocked (born 1962), American singer-songwriter
- Sisqó (born 1978), American singer-songwriter, record producer, dancer, and actor
- Mr. T (born 1952), American actor and professional wrestler
- Viscera (1971–2014), American professional wrestler
- Elisha Wiesel (born 1972), American hedge fund manager
- Wendy O. Williams (1949–1998), American singer
- Brian Wilson (born 1982), American MLB pitcher
- Joe Strummer (1952–2002), British punk rock vocalist
- Chuck Dukowski (born 1954), American punk rock musician
- Anthony Kiedis (born 1962), American musician and actor
- Flea (born 1962), American musician and actor
- John Frusciante (born 1970), American guitarist
- Mario Balotelli (born 1990), Italian professional footballer
- Arturo Vidal (born 1987), Chilean professional footballer
- Travis Barker (born 1975), American musician
- Andre Russell (born 1988), Jamaican cricketer
- Jared Leto (born 1971), American actor and musician
- G-Dragon (born 1988), Korean musician
- David Beckham (born 1975), English footballer
- Johnny Christ (born 1984), American bass guitarist
- Marek Hamšík (born 1987), Slovak professional footballer
- Neymar (born 1992), Brazilian professional footballer

== See also ==
- List of hairstyles
- Punk fashion
- Punk subculture
- Queue
- Roach (headdress)
