= Oseledets =

Style of haircut

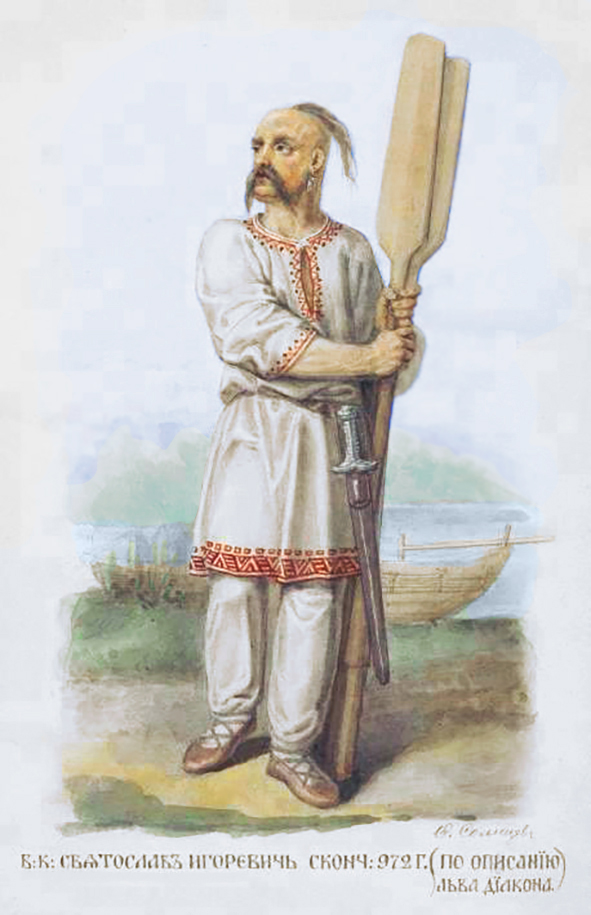
1869 depiction of Sviatoslav I, the prince of Kiev from 945 to 972

Oseledets (Ukrainian: оселедець, pronounced [oseˈlɛdetsʲ]) or chub (чуб [tʃub]) is a traditional Ukrainian hairstyle that features a long lock of hair sprouting from the top or the front of an otherwise closely shaven head (similar to a modern Mohawk). Most commonly it is associated with the Zaporozhian Cossacks.

== History ==
The earliest description of a possible oseledets comes from a description of Sviatoslav I (d. 972), prince of the Kievan Rus'. Sviatoslav's appearance has been described very clearly by Leo the Deacon, who himself attended the meeting of Sviatoslav with John I Tzimiskes. Following Deacon's memories, Sviatoslav had a bald head and a wispy beard and wore a bushy mustache and a sidelock as a sign of his nobility.

The House of Schwarzenberg c.o.a. includes "head of a Turk pecked by a raven"

A distinctive appearance of Turkic Kizilbash was a shaved beard with long moustache and a shaved head with a long lock, akin to the oseledets.

During the 16th and 17th century, the Cossacks of Ukraine shaved their heads, leaving a long central strip which was often braided or tied in a topknot.

The oseledets underwent a revival among romantics and nationalists during the early 20th century. Romantic painters associated Leo the Deacon's description of Sviatoslav's appearance and equestrian lifestyle with the cossacks and depicted him as such.

After independence, the oseledets made a comeback among modern Ukrainians. It was seen during the Euromaidan protests of 2014.

The Ukrainian name for this type of haircut is oseledets (Ukrainian: оселедець, literally "herring") or chub (Ukrainian: чуб, meaning "crest"). There are several Ukrainian surnames derived from this word.

The oseledets/khokhol is a standard feature in the stereotypical image of a Ukrainian Cossack. This haircut is depicted in various motion pictures such as The Lost Letter that is based on works of Nikolai Gogol.

== Khokhol ==
Historically, Ukrainians used the term khokhol amongst themselves as a form of ethnic self-identification to visibly separate themselves from Russians.

A Russian name for the oseledets hairstyle, khokhol (хохол, Russian pronunciation: [xɐˈxol]) is commonly used as an ethnic slur for a Ukrainian male (feminine form: Russian: хохлу́шка, romanized: khokhlushka), as it was a common haircut of Ukrainian Cossacks. The term is usually derogatory or condescending. The word comes from Proto-Slavic xoxolъ < *koxolъ, lit. 'crest, tuft'. Accordingly, Khokhliandiya (Russian: Хохляндия, Хохландия) and Khokhlostan (Russian: Хохлостан) are derogatory references to Ukraine.

== Gallery ==
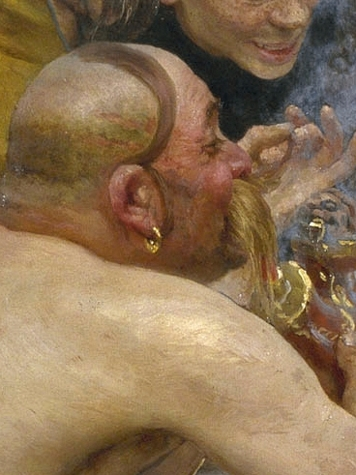
A fragment from Reply of the Zaporozhian Cossacks (1880-91); painted by Ilya Repin

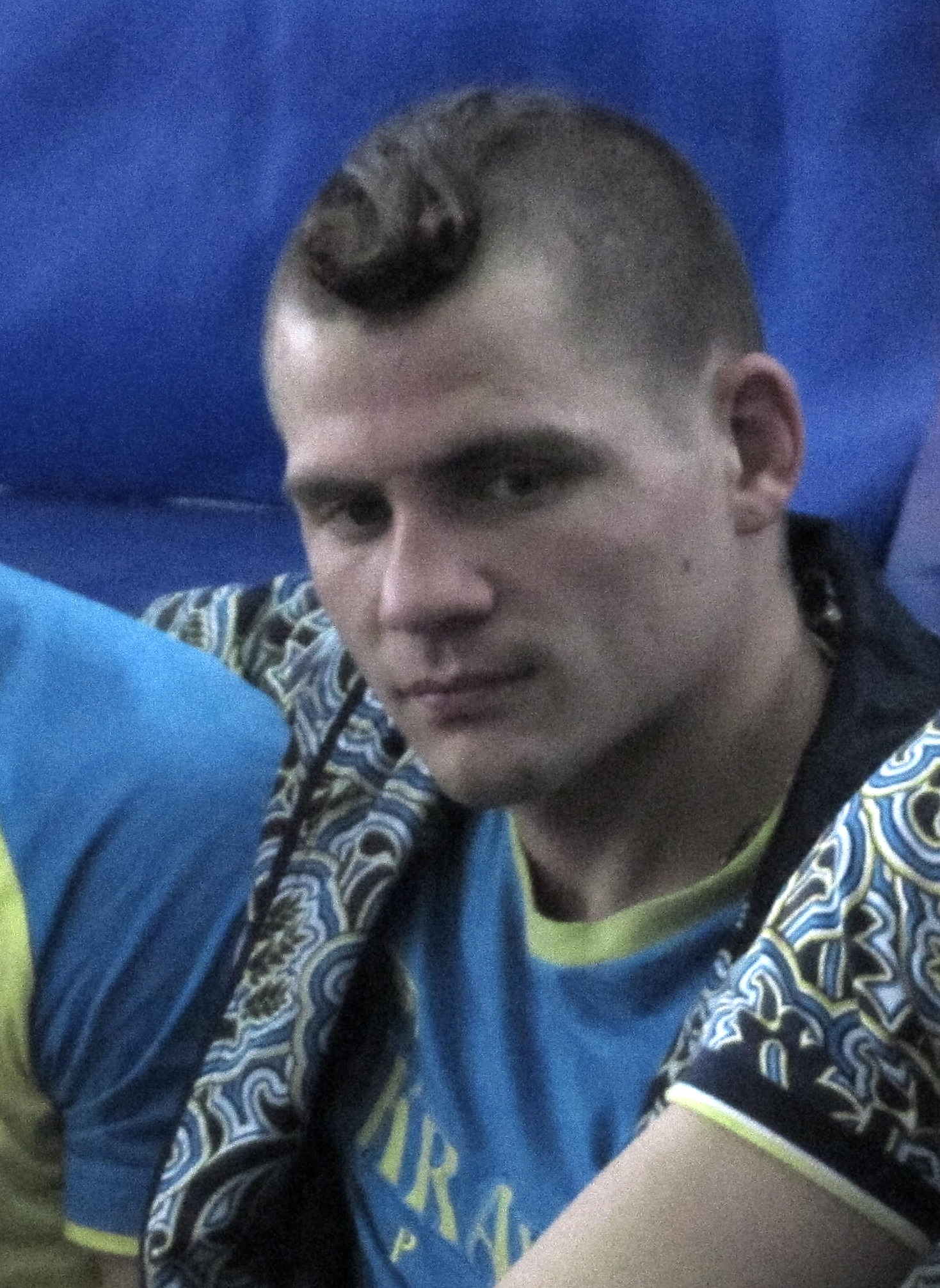
Boxer Denys Berinchyk, 2012

== See also ==
Hairstyles:

- List of hairstyles (with illustrations)
- Chupryna
- Chonmage
- Sikha

Slurs:

- Anti-Ukrainian sentiment
- Moskal
- Ukrop
- Vatnik (slang)

== Bibliography ==
- Хохол // Словник української мови : в 11 т. — К. : Наукова думка, 1970–1980.
- (рос.)Андрей Моченов, Сергей Никулин. «Хохлы», «пиндосы», «чухонцы» и прочие «бусурмане» в Рунете и российской прессе. 28 июня 2006. MCK
- (рос.)Заява національно-культурної автономії українців Новосибірську
- Хахол // Украдене ім'я: Чому русини стали українцями / Є. П. Наконечний; Передмова Я. Дашкевича. — 3-є, доп. і випр. вид. — Львів, 2001. — 400 с. — ISBN 966-02-1895-8
- (рос.)Етимологічний словник Фасмера стор.796
- Ставицька Леся. Українська лексика в російському та польському жаргонно-сленговому вокабулярі / Александр Бирих (нім. Alexander Bierich) // Субстандартные варианты славянских языков. — Київ : Peter Lang. Internationaler Verlag der Wissenschaften, 2008. — № 17 (Серпень). — С. 198. — ISSN 0930-7281. — ISBN 978-3-631-57010-4
- Хохо́л // Етимологічний словник української мови : у 7 т. : т. 6 / редкол.: О. С. Мельничук (гол. ред.) та ін. — К. : Наукова думка, 2012. — Т. 6 : У — Я. — С. 205–206. — ISBN 978-966-00-0197-8
- Хохол // Українська мала енциклопедія : 16 кн. : у 8 т. / проф. Є. Онацький. — Накладом Адміністратури УАПЦ в Аргентині. — Буенос-Айрес, 1967. — Т. 8, кн. XVI : Літери Уш — Я. — С. 2017. — 1000 екз.
- Б. Н. Флоря. О значении термина «Хохол» и производных от него в русских источниках первой половины XVII в. (эпизод из истории русско-польско-украинских контактов) // STUDIA POLONICA. К 60-летию Виктора Александровича Хорева. М.: Институт славяноведения и балканистики РАН, 1992.(рос.)
