= Stanisław Jastrzębski =

Polish writer, lawyer and historian

- Born: Bubło, Rohatyn County, Stanisławów Voivodeship, Second Polish Republic
- Education: University of Wrocław
- Occupations: Writer, lawyer, historian
- Notable work: Ludobójstwo nacjonalistów ukraińskich na Polakach na Lubelszczyźnie w latach 1939-1947, Samoobrona Polaków na Kresach Południowo-Wschodnich II RP w latach 1939-1946

Stanisław Jastrzębski is a Polish writer, lawyer and historian.

== Early life ==
He was born in the village of Bubło, Rohatyn County, in Stanisławów Voivodeship (currently Ukraine). Jastrzębski is a survivor of the World War II massacres of Poles in Volhynia, during which he witnessed the UPA murder of his family. Following Nazi and Soviet invasions of Poland, Jastrzębski was a soldier of Armia Krajowa and member of the Polish self-defence unit in Stanisławów, where he fought against OUN-UPA pacification raids. A political prisoner under Stalinism in the Polish People's Republic, he graduated from the Faculty of Law at the University of Wrocław.

== Career ==
For many years Jastrzębski worked as a barrister. As of 2009, Jastrzębski resided in Chorzów in southern Poland.

== Books ==
Jastrzębski's 2007 book Ludobójstwo nacjonalistów ukraińskich na Polakach na Lubelszczyźnie w latach 1939-1947 (English: Polish Genocide by Ukrainian Nationalists in/around Lublin Voivodeship in 1939–1947) revealed the extent of atrocities committed against Polish civilians in Kresy by bands of Ukrainian nationalists. The book made use of materials collected by the Society for the Remembrance of Victims of Genocide Committed by the Ukrainian Nationalists (Polish: Stowarzyszenie Upamiętnienia Ofiar Zbrodni Ukraińskich Nacjonalistów) and the Institute of National Remembrance.

In his 2008 book Samoobrona Polaków na Kresach Południowo-Wschodnich II RP w latach 1939-1946 (English: Polish Self-defence in Southeastern Kresy Region of Polish Second Republic), Jastrzębski conducted an in-depth study of the Polish attempts at self-defence against UPA pacification operations and gave a detailed account of the defence units' activities during Nazi German and Soviet occupation. The book was based on documents and narratives collected by the Polish Institute of National Remembrance.

=== Bibliography ===
- Oko w oko z banderowcami
- Wspomnienia zza krat PRL
- Moje Kresy wczoraj i dziś
- Kresy wschodnie we krwi
- Martyrologia polskiej ludności w województwie lwowskim w latach 1939-1947, zbrodnie popełnione przez nacjonalistów ukraińskich
- Ludobójstwo ludności polskiej przez OUN-UPA w województwie stanisławowskim w latach 1939-1946
- Ludobójstwo nacjonalistów ukraińskich na Polakach na Lubelszczyźnie w latach 1939-1947 Publisher: Nortom, 2007, ISBN 978-83-89684-04-2, 264 pages, (soft cover)
- Samoobrona Polaków na Kresach Południowo-Wschodnich II RP w latach 1939-1946] Publisher: Nortom, 2008, ISBN 978-83-89684-27-1, 244 pages (soft cover)
