= Czupryna =

Kind of haircut

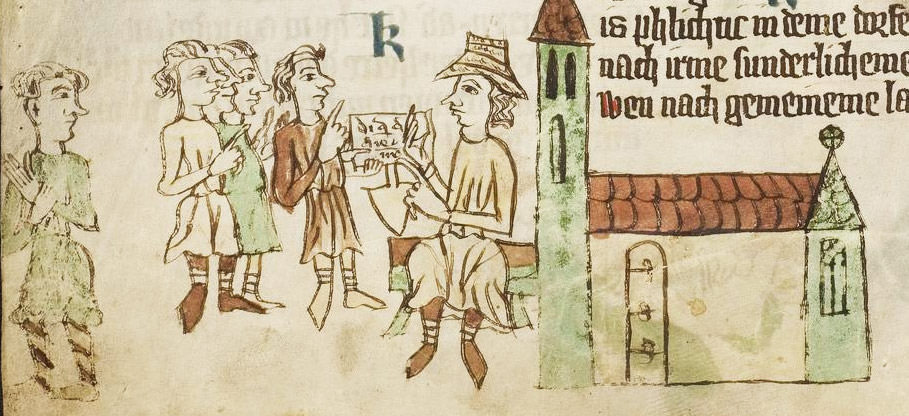
One of Sachsenspiegel's illustrations. A Wend stands at the left, gesturing that he does not understand the speech. He has a halfshaven head and characteristically wrapped legs, like all the Wends in the Sachsenspiegel.

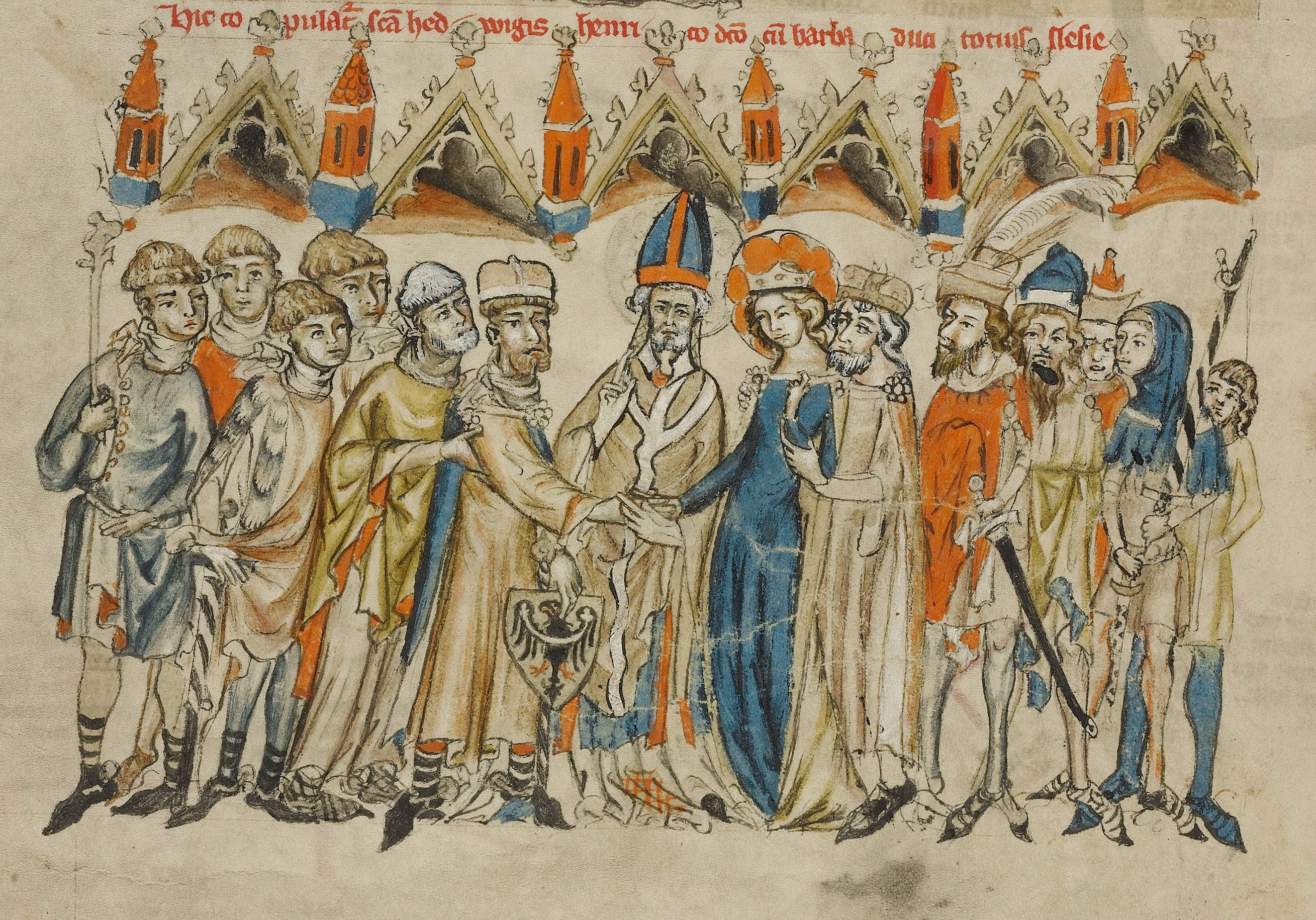
Henry I the Bearded and Jadwiga of Andechs wedding, 14th century Poles are on the left, with halfshaven heads. Medieval Poles didn't like long hair: Henry's beard was so strange to them that he was even called "the Bearded".

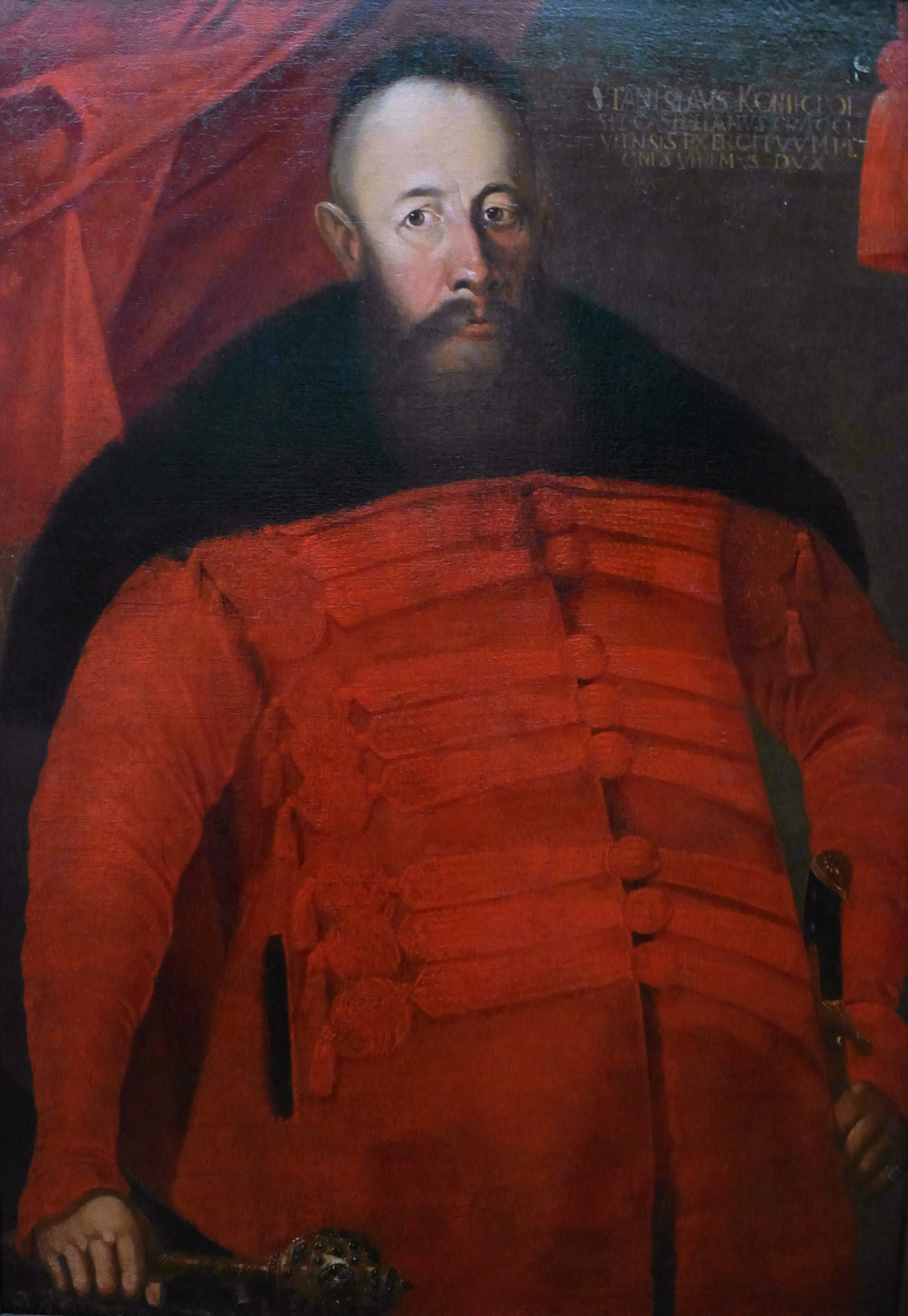
Stanisław Koniecpolski, 17th century

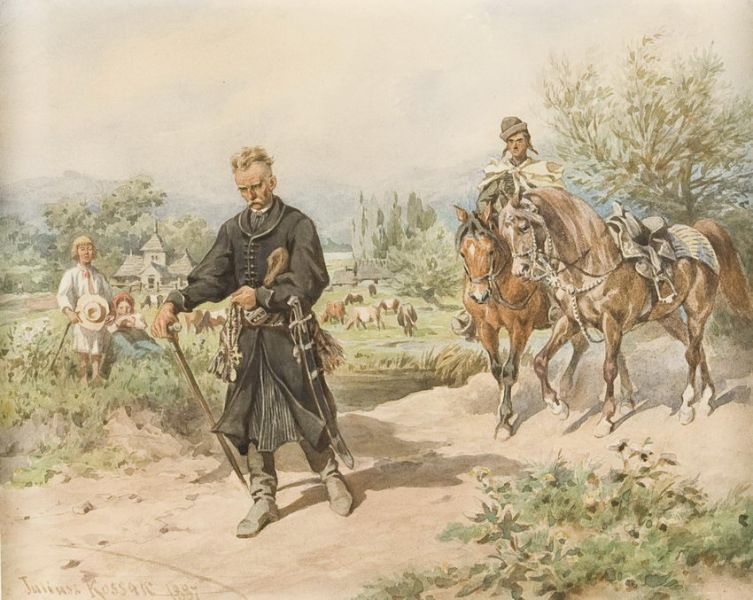
The Last of Nieczujas

The czupryna, also known as the Polish halfshaven head, is a traditional haircut of Polish nobility (szlachta), associated mainly with Sarmatism, but worn by Poles in the Middle Ages too. It is marked by shaving hair above the ears and on the neck at the same height, with longer hair on the top of the head. For hundreds of years it was typical of szlachta.

== History ==
The origins of the halfshaven head are not clear. It was probably worn before the 12th century until its slow disappearance in the 18th century. Some of the earliest mentions of the "Polish halfshaven head" from the Middle Ages were written by an anonymous Franciscan in 1308, Wincenty from Kielcza (half of 13th century), and Austrian poet Zygfryd Helbling (end of 13th century), who was swearing on Polish and Czech influences. In the chronicles of Mierzwa (beginning of 14th century) from Kraków, we can also read that Prince Leszek the Black (died in 1288) grew his hair to ingratiate himself with Germans, so it was a scandal both in his times and in the times of the chronicle. Graphic sources include the paten (half of 13th century) from Płock Cathedral commissioned by Konrad Mazowiecki, and the paten commissioned by Mieszko the Old (year 1195) for the Cistercian monastery in Ląd, and the floor from Wiślica (years 1175-1180).

== The halfshaven head and other Slavs ==
It is possible that not only Poles, but also other Slavs wore a halfshaven head. In the year 1235, the British Franciscan Bartholomeus Anglicus wrote in his encyclopedia that for the most part all the Slavs, except Ruthenians and those Slavs who were mixed with Germans and Latins, shave their heads. Bartholomeus, who lived in Magdeburg for several years, knew the Slavic lands well. By "Slavic lands" he meant the area from Saxony to Ruthenia and from Dalmatia, Carinthia and Serbia to the Baltic Sea. Saxo Grammaticus also wrote about shaven heads and the dislike of beards when writing about the Slavic temple of Arkona (Jaromarsburg). He wrote that according to the common custom, only priests could grow long hair and beards.

In a Saxon manifesto against Slavic pagans from the year 1108 it is mentioned that Slavs simulated Saxons during an attack by wearing their scalps - Saxons grew long hair, so the Polabian haircut had to be very different: very short. This suggests that the custom of shaving the hair, recognised as Polish in the 13th century, had to be more widespread.

The existence of the czupryna amongst the Polabian Slav territories is clearly attested by many archaeological discoveries. By way of example, one may adduce the following: a small bronze statue from Schwedt/Oder (X-11th century), Altfriesack Götze, a wooden statue from Altfriesack (6th-7th century), a sitting statue from Gatschow near Demmin (XI-12th century), and a small sculpture from Merserburg near Leipzig (10th century). All the figures have short hair and halfshaven heads. There are also a metal fitting from the museum in Oldburg and a wooden statue from Wolin (10th century). Because of corrosion, it is difficult to say if the heads are shaven, but the hair is surely short.<refname = "rssin"/> The clearest proof are the Sachsenspiegel illustrations - all Wends in the illustrations (in contrast with the long-haired Saxons) have a short haircut, shaved at ear-height.

A similar haircut, the oseledets, is seen as the mark of identification as a true Ukrainian Cossack.

== Types of halfshaven head ==
Through the centuries in Polish literature we can see a specialised nomenclature surrounding the czupryna. It is possible to distinguish various types:

- czupryna (staro)polska – the (old-)Polish czupryna. This is the oldest type of halfshaven head; we can see it in medieval sources, and similarly we know that Jan III Sobieski wore this type of czupryna too.
- czupryna łaszczowa or łaszczówka – Łaszcz's czupryna. This is the type of czupryna connected with Samuel Łaszcz, who, according to sources, popularised this type. In the czupryna łaszczowa type, the shaving was higher.
- czupryna czerkieska – the Cherkess halfshaven head. From the name, we can deduce that this type was probably similar to traditional Circassian male haircuts.
- czupryna szwedzka – the Swedish czupryna. According to the sources the shaving was lower, more similar to the Order of Saint Benedict tonsure, and sprinkled with powder.
- głowa cybulana – the onion-like head. A playful name for a trend of reducing the czupryna to some hair at the top of the head.

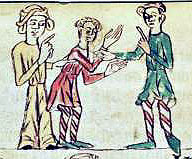
Another illustration of Wends from Sachsenspiegel.

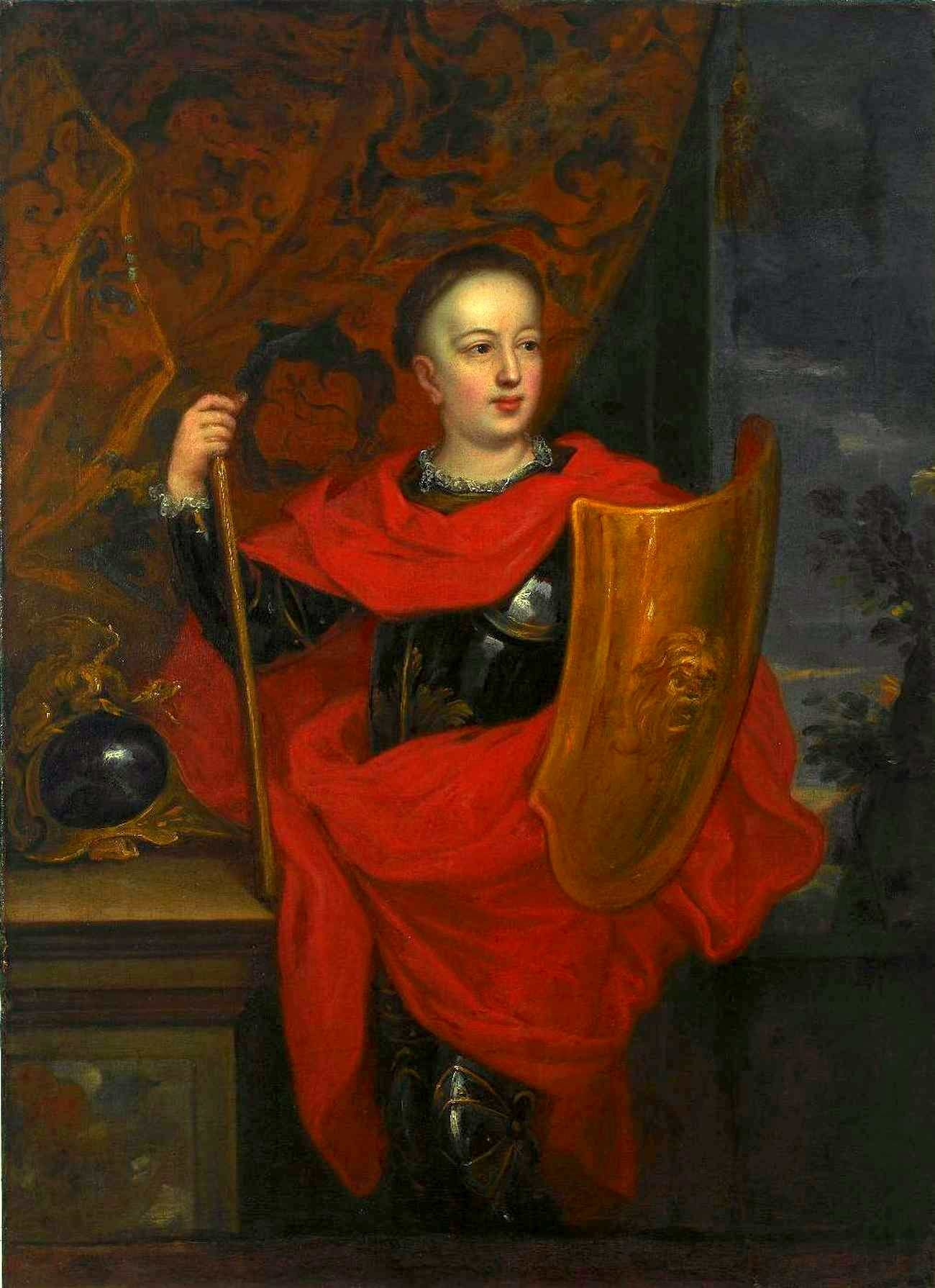
Aleksander Benedykt Sobieski, circa 1690

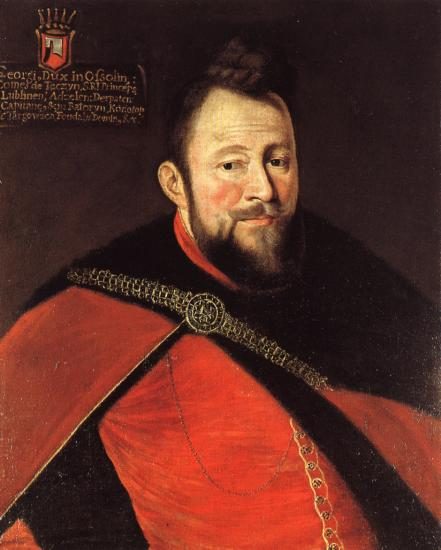
Jerzy Ossoliński, circa 1635. Another popular, later version of halfshaven haircut with a tuft on the top.

== See also ==
- Sarmatism
- Oseledets
- Bowl cut
- List of hairstyles
