= Hairstyling product =

Products used to change the texture or shape of hair

Hairstyle products are used to change the texture and/or shape of hair.

== History ==
Hairstyling products have had a significant impact on the creation of various hairstyles and trends throughout history. For the ancient Egyptians, physical appearance was very important to the embalming process. Hair was often styled to maintain the individuality of the deceased. A fatty substance, now known as hair gel, was used to style hair and keep it in place. The 1980s punk movement popularized using hair gel to sculpt spiky hairstyles, such as mohawks. The ancient Gauls had invented a waxy soap-like substance, similar to hair wax, as a hair styling agent. Many years later, the same soap-like substance was used as a cleaning agent. In 1948, Chase Products became the first company to package hair spray. Hair spray became very popular in the 1950s due to its ability to keep hair in place and prevent hair from falling out of a styled look.

Famous Hair Products

- Bear's grease made from bear fat and marrow had been in use as early as the 11th century as a baldness remedy. It was a trademark of Atkinson's of London, best known for their bear grease pomade.
- Rowland's Macassar Oil (1793) — London barber Alexander Rowland popularized the use of macassar oil among Western Europeans as a hair conditioner to groom and style with.
- Édouard Pinaud first presented his Brilliantine, a perfumed petroleum-derived product, at the 1900 World's Fair in Paris. His specialty store The House of Ed. Pinaud has been active since 1810 and among its specialties are included: Eau de Quinine and Lilac Vegetal.
- In 1909, a tailor named Garrett Augustus Morgan successfully marketed the first hair relaxer in American history, G. A. Morgan's Hair Refining Cream, which he discovered when searching for a chemical softener that works on natural fibers as well as hair.
- Madam C. J. Walker popularized her Wonderful Hair Grower and other hair products among the African-American community of early 20th Century America. A mixture of petroleum jelly and sulfur had been standard in the preceding centuries.
- Brylcreem is a popular brand of men's hair gel created in 1928 by County Chemicals in Birmingham, England.
- Manic Panic (brand) of hair dye and Schwarzkopf's göt2b hair gel are popular brands marketed toward youth grunge and punk subcultures. Also included are Arctic Fox, Directions UK, Color Crazy.
- L'Oréal, TRESemme, Pantene, Head & Shoulders, and Garnier Fructis are among the leading mass-market haircare brands in the West.
- Old Spice, Axe / Linx, American Crew, Pinaud's Clubman, Eco Style, and Shine 'n Jam are among the most represented men's hairstyling brands on the market in 21st century United States.
- Boutique salon brands include: George E. Johnson's men’s product Ultra Wave and women's Ultra Sheen in the 1950s. In the 21st century Western market: Rusk, John Frieda, Philip B., John Paul Mitchell's Hair System, drybar, Sebastian Professional, CHI and Biosilk by Farouk Shami are well known salon boutique lines.

== Types ==
=== Hair gel ===
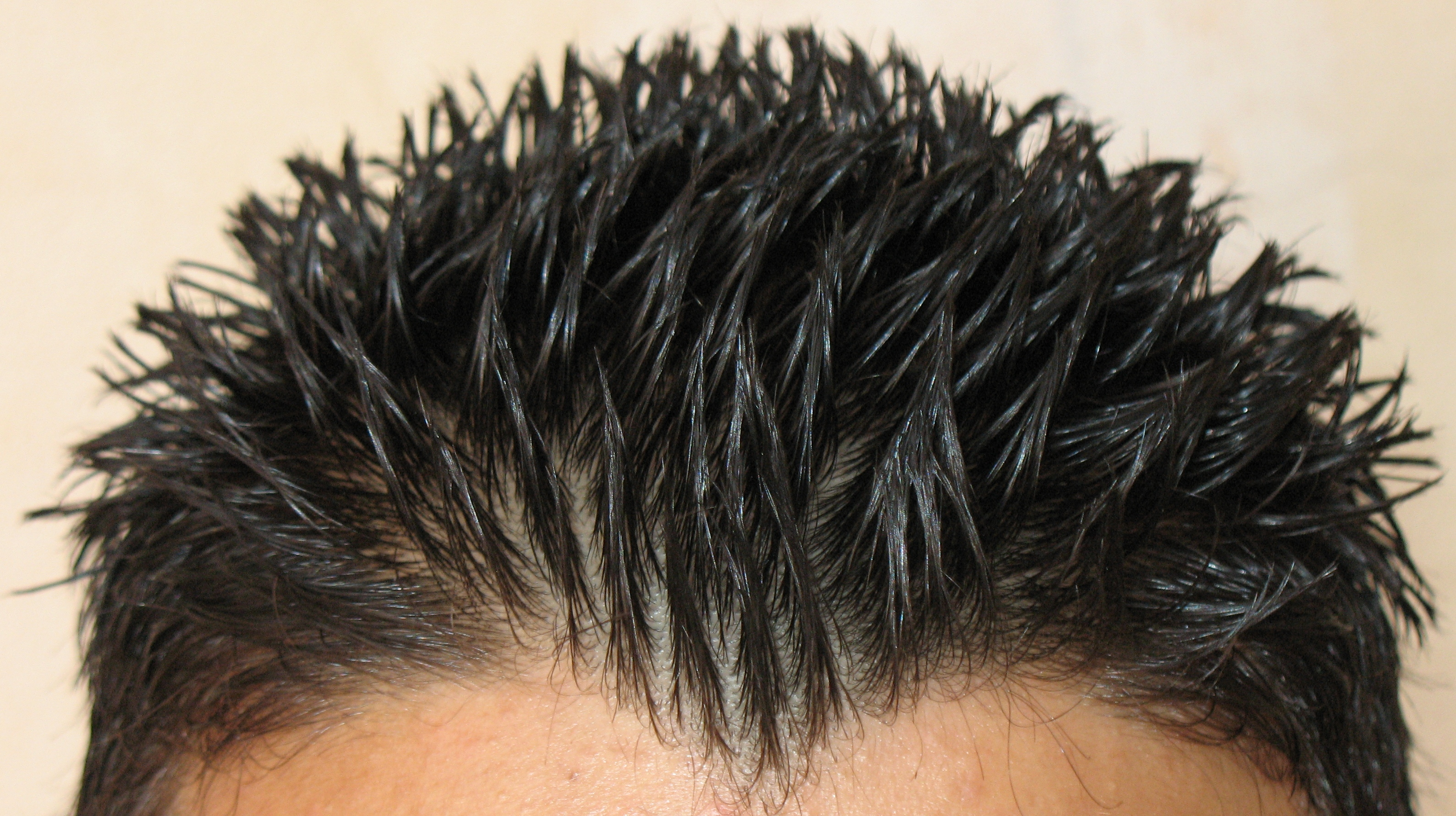
Hair styled with hair gel

Hair gel is a hairstyle product that is used to stiffen hair into a particular hairstyle. The end result is similar to, but stronger than, those of hair spray. Hair gel is most commonly used in the hairstyling of men, but it is not gender specific. Hair gel can come in tubes, pots, small bags, or even in a spray form.

=== Hair wax ===
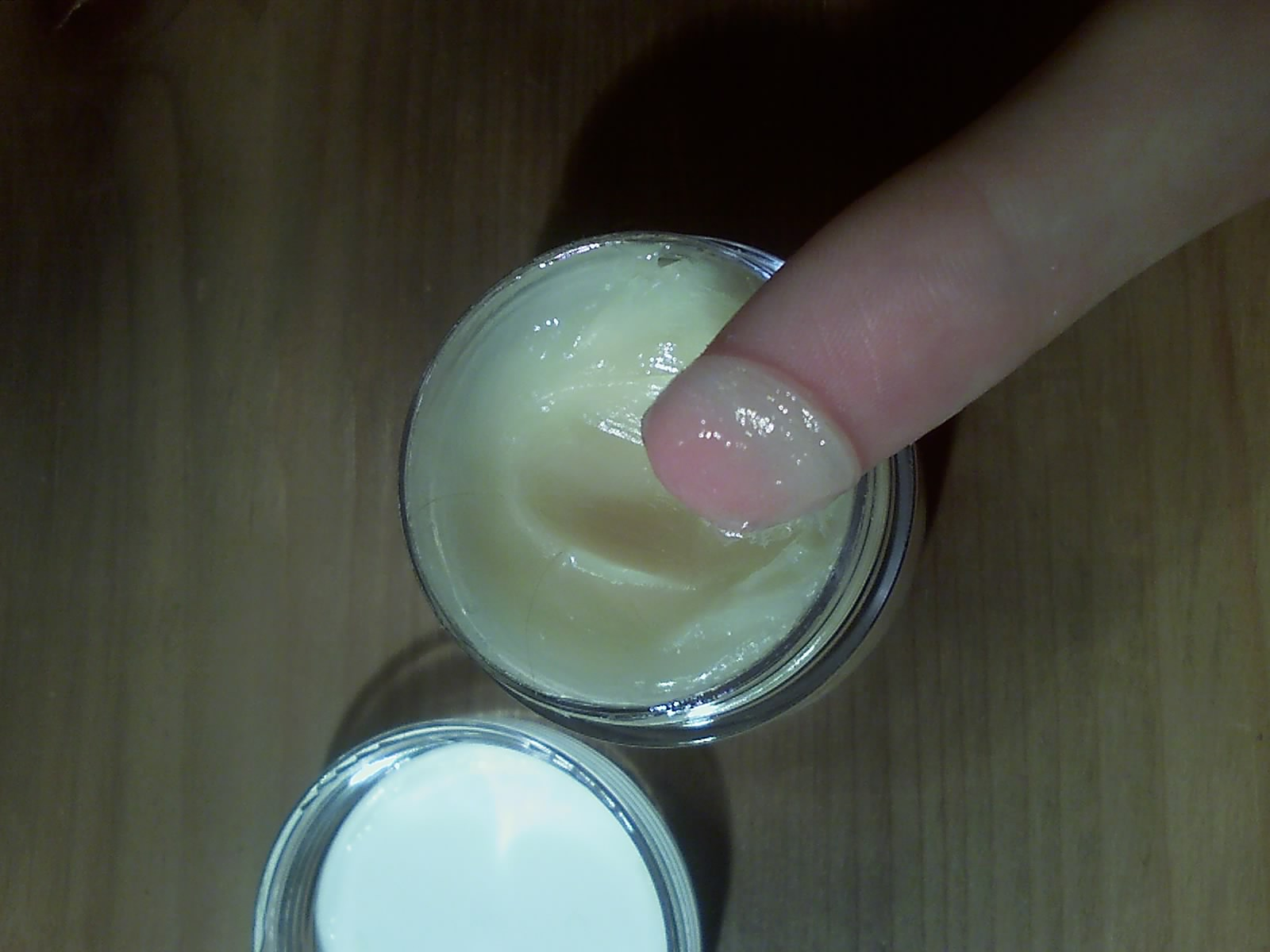
A small pot of hair pomade

Hair wax is a thick hair styling product containing wax, which helps hold hair in place. Unlike some products such as hair gel which leave the hair hard in texture, hair wax leaves the hair pliable. Many manufacturers are now releasing different versions of hair wax, such as pomade, putty, glue, glypto, whip, and styling paste.

=== Hair mousse ===
Hair mousse is a product added to hair for extra volume and shine. It is most commonly produced as a foam, but can also be found as a spray. Hair mousse adds volume without causing clumps or buildup. It is a lighter alternative to hair gel. Mousse is generally applied to the roots of damp hair before blow drying or styling. Mousse may also be used to add definition to curls, or to add texture to hair for a beach blown effect.

=== Pomade ===
Pomade is an oil-based or water-based product designed for slick and tight hairstyles. Unlike hair spray and hair gel, pomade does not dry and often takes several washes to remove. Grease-cutting shampoos and deep-cleansing conditioners can be used to quicken the removal process. Other methods of removal include the use of olive oil, dish washing liquid, and lemon juice.

Most oil based pomades contain petroleum jelly (and in fact, petroleum jelly can be used alone as a pomade) and mineral oil, and many also contain some sort of wax. They may also contain perfume and coloring agents. A plethora of pomades are still in production today and vary in factors such as weight, shine, and scent. The stiffest will have a higher proportion of beeswax while the lightest may have a higher proportion of oils.

=== Hair spray ===
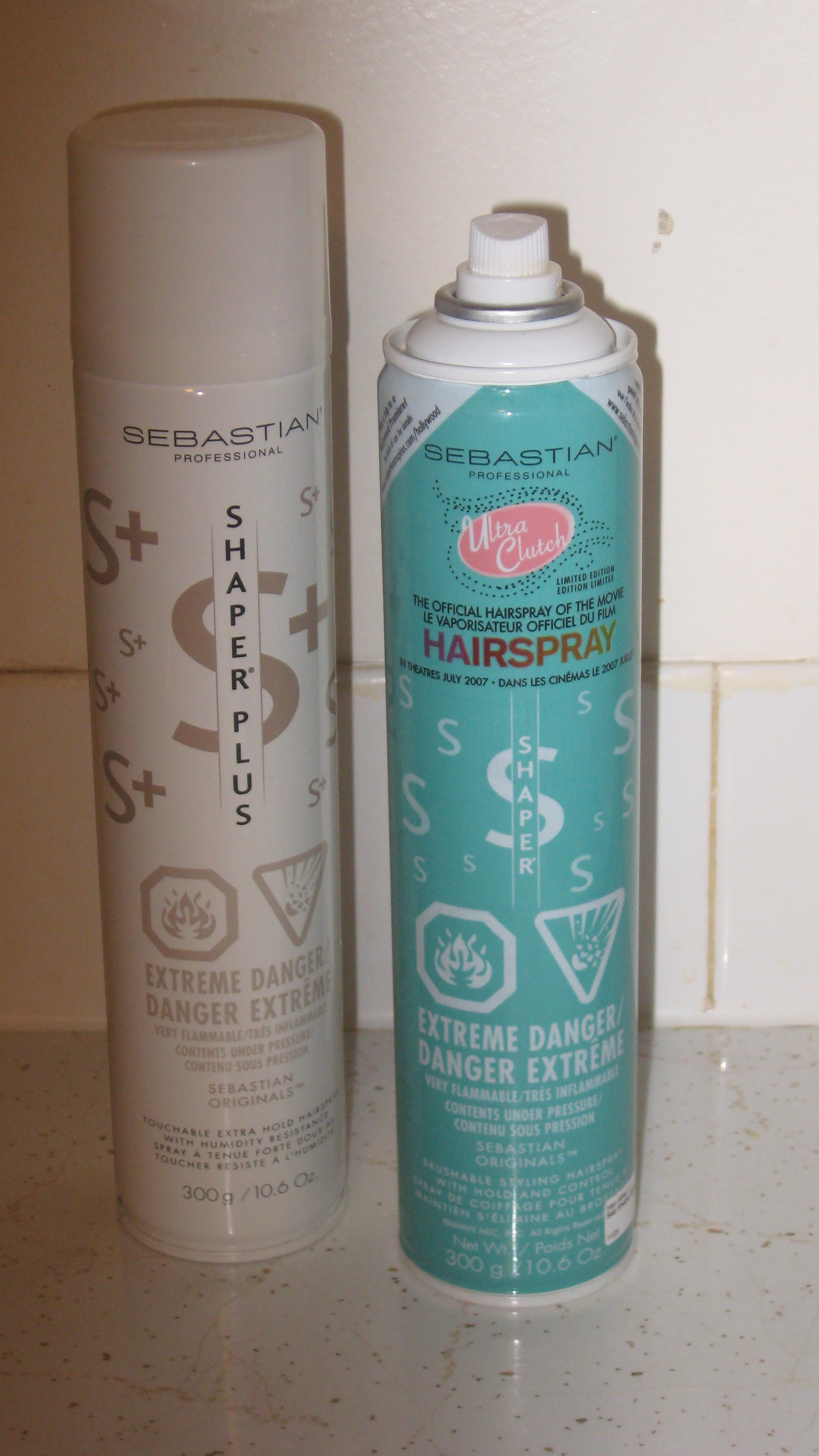
Cans of hairspray

Hair spray is a common household aqueous solution which is used to stiffen hair into a certain style. It was first developed and manufactured in 1948 by Chase Products, based in Broadview, Illinois. Weaker than hair gel or hair wax, it is sprayed directly onto the hair to hold styles for long periods of time. It sprays evenly over the hair using a pump or aerosol spray nozzle. The product may leave hair feeling 'crunchy' unless brushed out.

The active ingredients in hair spray are called polymers, which keep the hair stiff and firm without snapping. Solvents, which make up most of the content of the hairspray, are responsible for carrying these polymers in a solution.

Originally, the solvent found in hair spray was a chlorofluorocarbon (CFC). CFCs are nontoxic, nonflammable, and make almost ideal aerosol propellants. However, when research concluded that CFCs cause destruction of stratospheric ozone, they were replaced with other solvents, such as alcohols and hydrocarbons.

One of the polymers used in hair spray is polyvinylpyrrolidone, which is water-soluble. The non-water-soluble polymer polydimethylsiloxane is added to make the hold last a bit longer. Some less common polymers found in hair spray include copolymers with vinyl acetate and copolymers with maleic anhydride.

Some hair sprays use natural polymers and solvents like vegetable gums dissolved in alcohol. One popular ingredient in natural hair sprays is gum arabic, which is made from the sap of various species of the acacia tree. Gum tragacanth is another herbal gum that is used to stiffen calico and crepe, as well as hair.

=== Hair volumizer ===
Hair volumizers are used to temporarily add volume, body and shine to thin or flat hair. Hair volumizers are used by both men and women. Men turn to hair volumizers to make their hair look more dense. Volumizers come in many forms such as shampoos, conditioners, sprays, pomades and lotions.

Hair volumizers contain humectants, which work by attracting moisture from the surrounding areas to the hair strand, thereby swelling the hair and making it look thicker. Various polymers present in the volumizer coat the hair strand, making it look thicker and shiny.

Shampoo and conditioner forms of the volumizers are used just like ordinary shampoo or conditioners. The spray and lotion form of volumizers are used on damp hair near the roots of the hair. To use a hair volumizer, the person using the product must flip their head downward and gradually blow dry the hair, with the air being blown along the shaft of the hair until the hair is dry. Drying the hair in this position will increase volume and achieve the desired effect.

While the hairstyling products listed above are the most commonly used, there are other types of products as well. Serums, leave-in conditioner, clays, hair tonic, hair dry powder shampoo, and heat protection sprays are frequently used hairstyling products in salons and homes across the country.

== Disadvantages ==
When applied properly, most styling products will not damage the hair. However, there is always a risk of the hair drying out when using any type of styling product. Some styling products contain ingredients that can dissolve the hair's natural oils, or ingredients which can cause a build-up that results in so-called "dull hair". This build-up of harmful ingredients can cause problems such as dry hair, hair breakage, eczema, or the thinning of hair.

When using a hair dryer to dry and shape one's hair, the heat being applied can cause damage to the hair strands. This heat damage can be prevented by using some sort of heat protectant spray.

== See also ==
- Comb
- Hairbrush
- Hair dryer
- Hair iron
- Hair clay
- Pomade
- Hair texture powder
- List of hairstyles
