= Barber =

Person who cuts, dresses, grooms, styles and shaves males' hair or beards

Barber, Hairdresser
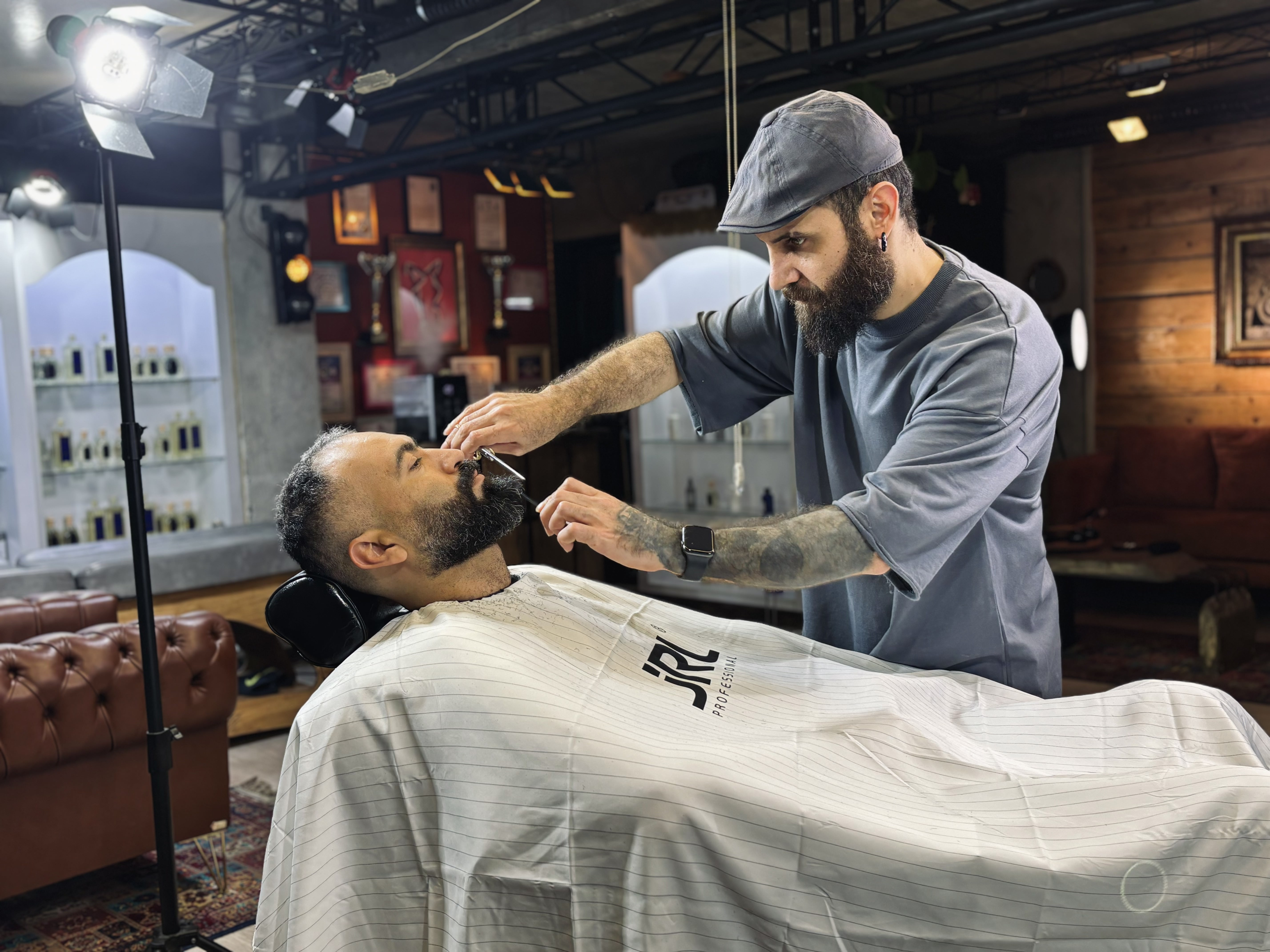
- A barber shaping his customer's beard in Ahvaz, Iran, c. 2022

Occupation
- Names: Barber, hairdresser
- Occupation type: Vocation

Description
- Fields of employment: Barbershops, hair salons, hairdressing salons

A barber is a person whose occupation is mainly to cut, dress, groom, style and shave hair or beards. A barber's place of work is known as a barbershop, barbing salon (in Nigeria) or the barber's. Barbershops have been noted as places of social interaction and public discourse since at least classical antiquity. In some instances, barbershops were also public forums. They were the locations of open debates, voicing public concerns, and engaging citizens in discussions about contemporary issues.

In previous times, barbers (known as barber surgeons) also performed surgery and dentistry. With the development of safety razors and the decreasing prevalence of beards in Anglophonic cultures, most barbers now specialize in cutting men's scalp hair as opposed to facial hair.

== Names ==
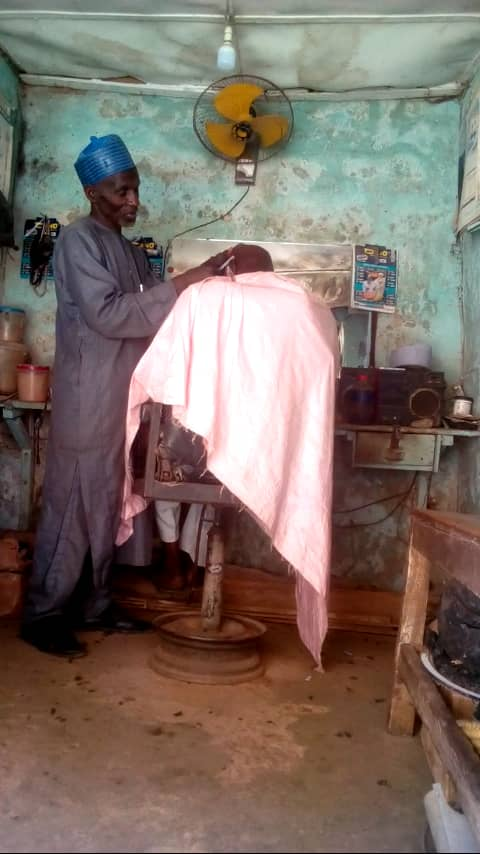
A traditional Hausa barber (Wanzami)

In modern times, the term "barber" is used both as a professional title and to refer to hairdressers who specialize in men's hair. Historically, all hairdressers were considered barbers. In the 20th century, the profession of cosmetology branched off from barbering, and today hairdressers may be licensed as either barbers or cosmetologists. Barbers differ with respect to where they work, which services they are licensed to provide, and what name they use to refer to themselves. Part of this terminology difference depends on the regulations in a given location.

In the early 1900s, an alternative word for barber, "chirotonsor", came into use in the U.S.

Different states in the US vary in their labor and licensing laws. For example, in Maryland and Pennsylvania, a cosmetologist cannot use a straight razor, strictly reserved for barbers. In contrast, in New Jersey both are regulated by the State Board of Cosmetology and there is no longer a legal difference in barbers and cosmetologists, as they are issued the same license and can practice both the art of straight razor shaving, coloring, other chemical work and haircutting if they choose.

In Australia, during the mid to late 20th century, the official term for a barber was men's hairdresser; barber was only a popular title for men's hairdressers. During this time, most would work in either a barbershop or a hairdressing salon.

In West Africa, especially in Nigeria, a place where barbers work would be called a barbing salon.

== History ==
=== Antiquity ===
The barber's trade has a long history: razors have been found among relics of the Bronze Age (around 3500 BC) in Egypt. The first barbering services were performed by Egyptians in 5000 BC with instruments they had made from oyster shells or sharpened flint. In ancient Egyptian culture, barbers were highly respected individuals. Priests and men of medicine are the earliest recorded examples of barbers. In addition, the art of barbering played a significant role across continents. Mayan, Aztec, Iroquois, Norse and Mongolian cultures utilized shave art as a way to distinguish roles in society and wartime. Men in Ancient Greece would have their beards, hair, and fingernails trimmed and styled by the κουρεύς (cureus), in an agora (market place) which also served as a social gathering for debates and gossip. The barbers used a rough cloth (ὠμόλινον) on their shoulders to keep the hairs off their dresses. There were also female barbers (κουρεύτριαι).

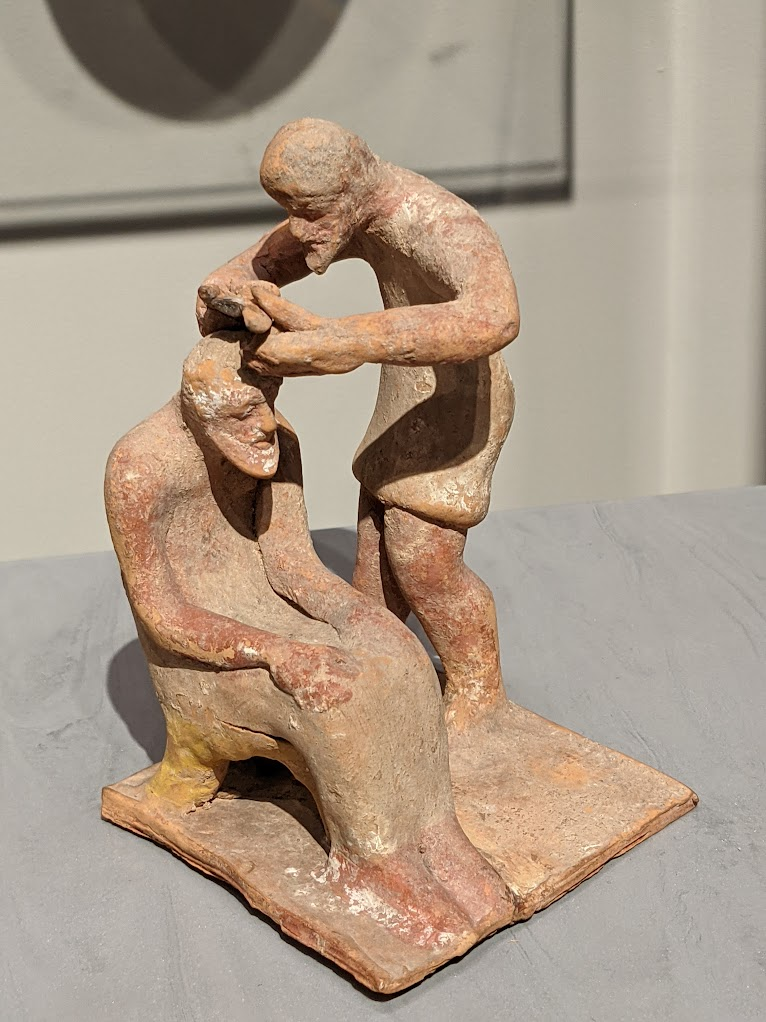
Boiotian Greek painted terracotta figure dating between c. 500 and c. 475 BCE, showing a barber cutting a man's hair, currently in the Boston's Museum of Fine Arts

Barbering was introduced to Rome by the Greek colonies in Sicily in 296 BC, and barbershops (Latin: tonstrīna, lit. "clipperies") quickly became very popular centers for daily news and gossip. A morning visit to the barber (tonsor) became a part of the daily routine, as important as the visit to the public baths, and a young man's first shave (tonsura) was considered an essential part of his coming of age ceremony. Roman barbers employed rudimentary mirrors and wielded combs, razors, scissors, curling irons, specialized tools for beard removal and pomata to remove unwanted hair elsewhere. A few Roman barbers became wealthy and influential, running shops that were favorite public locations of high society. Most, however, were simple tradesmen who owned small storefronts or worked in the streets for low prices.

=== Middle Ages ===
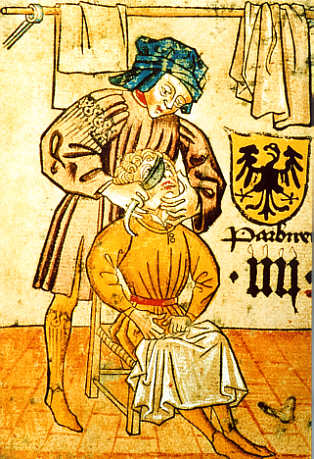
Barber on the Hofämterspiel card game, 15th century

Starting from the Middle Ages, barbers often served as surgeons and dentists. In addition to haircutting, hairdressing, and shaving, barbers performed surgery, bloodletting and leeching, fire cupping, enemas, and the extraction of teeth; earning them the name "barber surgeons". Barber-surgeons began to form powerful guilds such as the Worshipful Company of Barbers in London. Barbers received higher pay than surgeons until surgeons were entered into British warships during naval wars. Some of the duties of the barber included neck manipulation, cleansing of ears and scalp, draining of boils, fistula and lancing of cysts with wicks.

=== 19th and 20th centuries ===
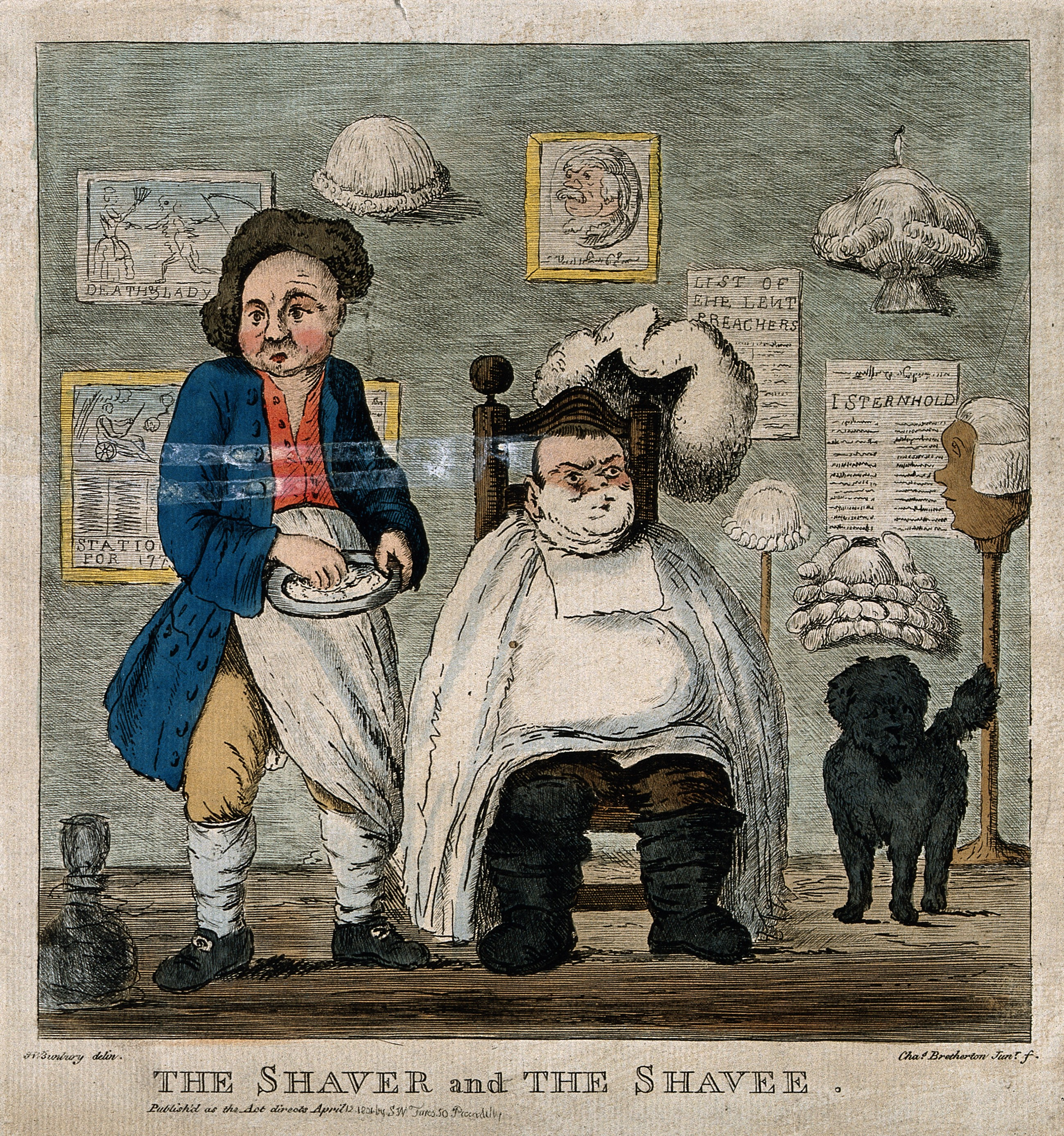
A barber getting ready to shave the face of a seated customer. Coloured etching by C. Bretherton, c. 1801, after H.W. Bunbury.

Barbershops were influential at the turn of the 19th century in the United States as African American businesses that helped to develop African American culture and economy. According to Trudier Harris, "In addition to its status as a gathering place, the black barbershop also functioned as a complicated and often contradictory microcosm of the larger world. It is an environment that can bolster egos and be supportive as well as a place where phony men can be destroyed, or at least highly shamed, from participation in verbal contests and other contests of skill. It is a retreat, a haven, an escape from nagging wives and the cares of the world. It is a place where men can be men. It is a place, in contrast to Gordone's bar, to be somebody." Barbershops from black barbers at first mostly served wealthy whites. In the later part of the century, they opened barbershops in black communities to serve black people. The average shop cost $20 to equip in 1880. It was about ten by twelve feet. A hair cut in 1880 would cost five or ten cents and shaving cost three cents.

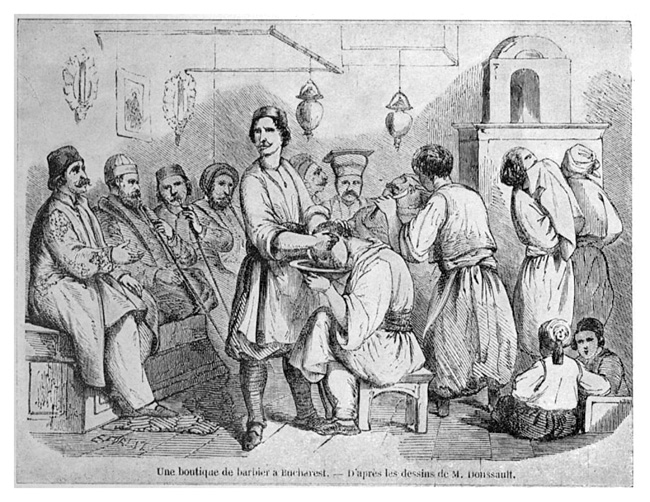
Barbershop in Bucharest, c. 1842. The barbershop also provides an opportunity for social contacts.

In the late 19th and early 20th centuries, barbershops became a common business in the United States where people would go to have their hair cut by a professional barber with good equipment. People would also play board games, talk about recent events, or gossip. They have also occasionally been used for public debates or voicing public concerns.

=== Contemporary ===
Most modern barbershops have special barber chairs, and special equipment for rinsing and washing hair. In some barbershops, people can read magazines or watch TV while the barber works.

Despite the economic recession in 2008, the barbershop industry has seen continued positive growth. In 2018, there was a trial that had barbers check high blood pressure in barbershops and have a pharmacist meet and treat the patient in the barbershop, with positive results.

In 2018, Arthur Rubinoff opened a museum with barber poles and antique barber equipment in Manhattan.

The barber Sam Mature, whose interview with Studs Terkel was published in Terkel's 1974 book Working, says "A man used to get a haircut every couple weeks. Now he waits a month or two, some of 'em even longer than that. A lot of people would get manicured and fixed up every week. Most of these people retired, moved away, or died. It's all on account of long hair. You take old-timers, they wanted to look neat, to be presentable. Now people don't seem to care too much."

Given their importance as social hubs in certain cultures, barbershops have been used in educational campaigns. These include the U.S. literacy project Barbershop Books, which sets up reading stations in barbershops to promote a culture of reading among African American boys. Public health researchers have also explored barbershops as a venue for sexual health education.

== Barber schools ==
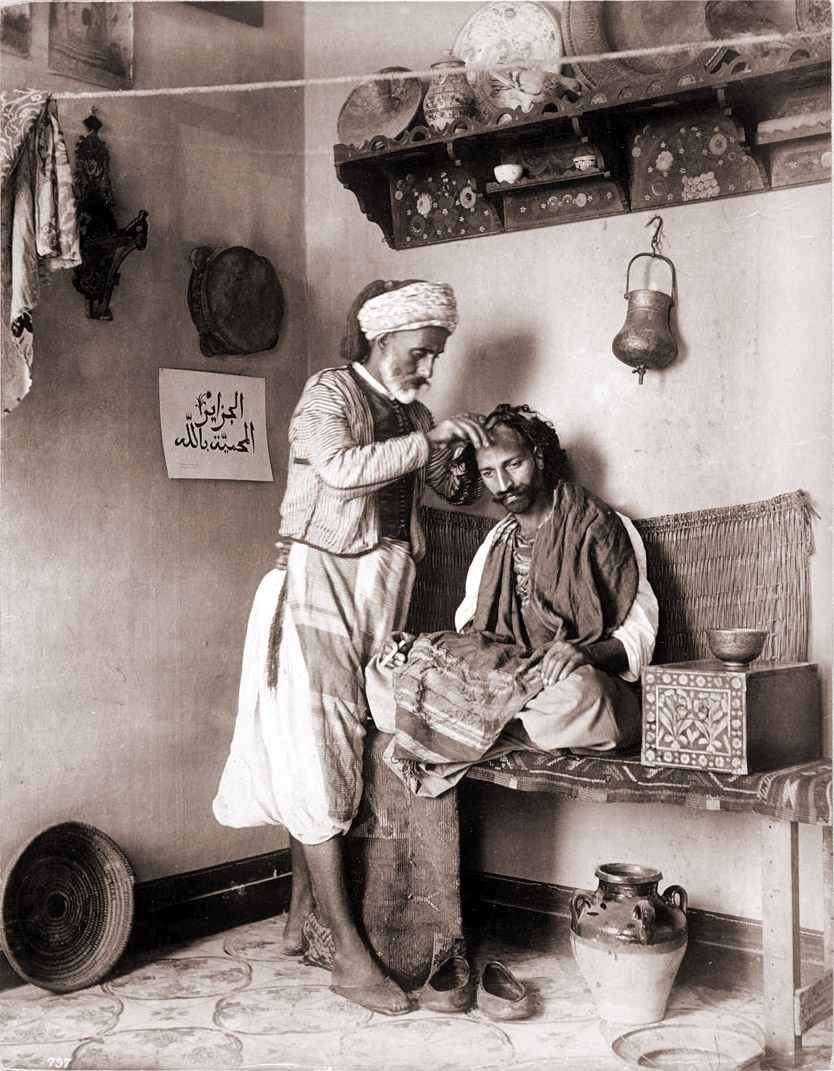
A barber and his customer in Algeria, c. 1892

In 1893, A. B. Moler of Chicago established a school for barbers. This was the first institution of its kind in the world, and its success was apparent from its very start. It stood for higher education in the ranks, and the parent school was rapidly followed by branches in nearly every principal city of the United States. In the beginning of barber schools, only the practical work of shaving, hair-cutting, facial treatments, etc., was taught as neither the public nor the profession was ready to accept scientific treatments of hair, skin and scalp. Not until about 1920 was much effort made to professionalize the work.

Training to be a barber is achieved through various means around the world. In the US, barber training is carried out at "barber schools".

=== Curriculum ===
A barber practicing a haircut on a mannequin head in Tokyo, Japan

The barber school curriculum consists of hair cutting, coloring and styling for men's hair and women's short hair. Chemical processes such as bleaching, dyeing, lightening and relaxing hair may also be taught. All cosmetology disciplines learn safety and sanitation best practices. Barber students can expect to learn some elements of anatomy, physiology, bacteriology and some small elements of pharmacology. It also teaches facial hair techniques, including traditional and modern shaves. Generally barber programs touch on scalp massage and treatments. Advanced barber training may include custom shave designs. It is more common in barbering schools than other cosmetology disciplines to get some business and ethics education, since entrepreneurship is especially common in the barbering trade with many professionals choosing to open their own barbershops. All the skills learned in barber school will be tested at the board exams, which typically feature a written and practical exam.

=== Cost ===
Many states require a barber license in order to practice barbering professionally. The cost of barber school varies from state to state, and also from metro area to metro area. Schools in larger metropolitan areas tend to cost more than those located in more rural towns. Brand names can also affect the cost of barber school. Most barber schools cost between $6,500 and $10,000 to complete. Because each state has different minimums for training hours, the length and cost of the program can vary accordingly. Some schools' tuition includes supplies and textbooks, whereas others do not. Barber license exam fees typically range from $50 to $150.

=== Length ===
Most states require the same amount of training hours for barbers as they do for cosmetologists. The number of hours required ranges from 800 to 2,000 training hours, depending on the state's licensing requirements. Most programs can be completed in 15 months or fewer.

== Barber's pole ==
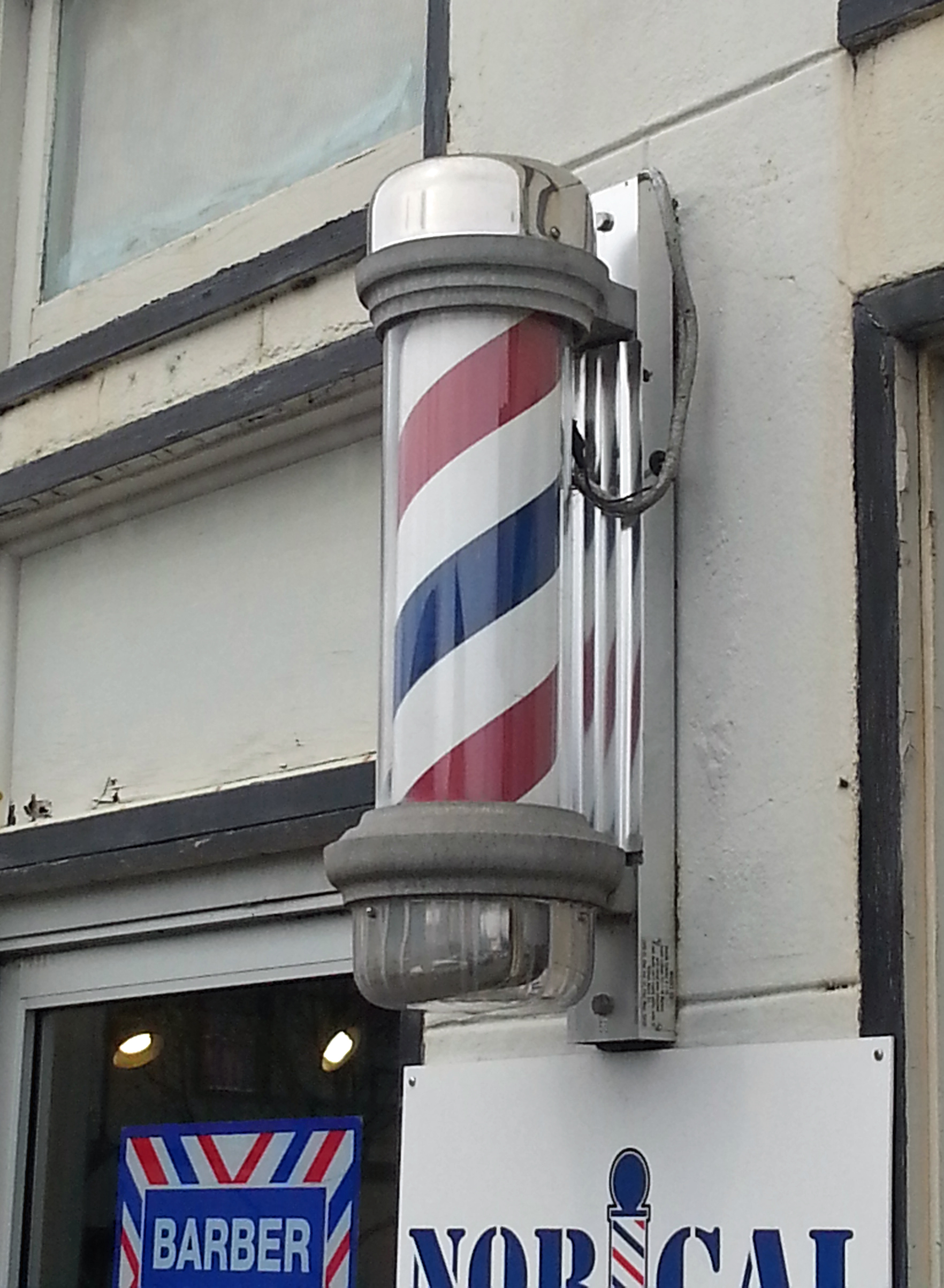
A red, white and blue striped pole

The barber pole, featuring blue, red and white spiraling stripes, symbolizes different aspects of the craft. It is a symbol from the time when barbers used to perform medical procedures. The white and red stripes represent bandages and blood while the blue stripes represent veins. The pole may be stationary or may rotate, often with the aid of an electric motor. A spinning barber pole creates a visual illusion, in which the stripes appear to be traveling up or down the length of the pole, rather than around it.

In the United States, the blue stripe is also sometimes used to match the flag. In South Korea, barber's poles are used both for actual barbershops and for brothels. In Forest Grove, Oregon, the "World's Tallest Barber Shop Pole" measures 72 feet (22 m).

Because of its bright bands and colors, the redbanded rockfish Sebastes babcocki is referred to as "barber pole". Other pseudonyms include bandit, convict, canary, Hollywood, and Spanish flag.

The phrase barber pole is derisive jargon in craps, and refers to the commingling of "gaming cheques of different denominations". Wagers that combine different denominations are "supposed to be stacked with the highest denomination at the bottom".

== Equipment ==
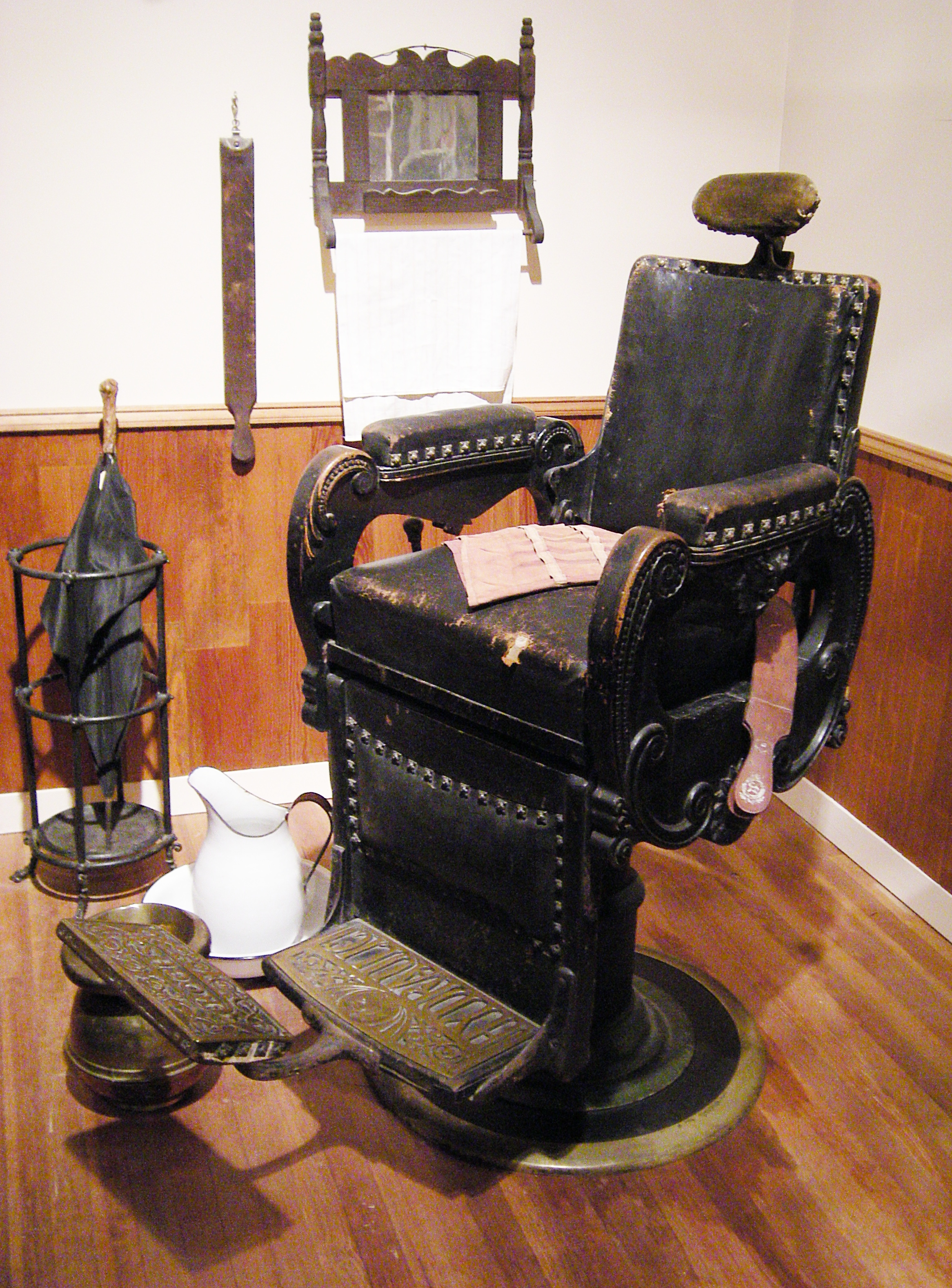
A barber chair in a recreation of J. N. Hooper's Barber Shop (Seattle, WA circa 1880s) at the Museum of History and Industry

- Barber chair
- Hair clipper
- Barbers' articles (20th century)
- Barber cloth or wrap (Victoria, Australia)
- Barber powder (talcum powder or baby powder)
- Hairbrush
- Comb
- Barber neck paper/tape
- Barber mirror or back mirror
- Hair brilliantine
- Disinfectant or barbicide
- Hair cream
- Hair dryer, hair blower or blow drier
- Hair gel
- Hair pomade
- Hair texture powder
- Hair scissors
- Hair spray
- Hair tonic
- Hair wax
- Razor strop
- Shave brush
- Shaving oil
- Straight razor
- Station mat
- Mustache wax
- Shaving soap or shaving cream

The market for barber supplies is estimated to have revenue of around twenty billion dollars. The industry in the U.S. market is expected to grow by around 3% per year between 2017 and 2022.

== Animals ==
The term "barbering" when applied to laboratory mice is a behavior where mice will use their teeth to pluck out hairs from the face of cage mates when they groom each other. It is practised by both male and female mice. The "barber" plucks the vibrissae of the recipient. The behavior is probably related to social dominance.

== In popular culture ==
- Sweeney Todd: The Demon Barber of Fleet Street — 1979 musical with music and lyrics by Stephen Sondheim, book by Hugh Wheeler
- The Barber of Seville — an opera buffa (comic opera) in two acts composed by Gioachino Rossini with an Italian libretto by Cesare Sterbini
- The Village Barbershop — a 2008 independent film written and directed by Chris J. Ford
- The Village Barber —a 2026 South Korean reality show starring licensed barber and actor Park Bo-gum

== Gallery ==
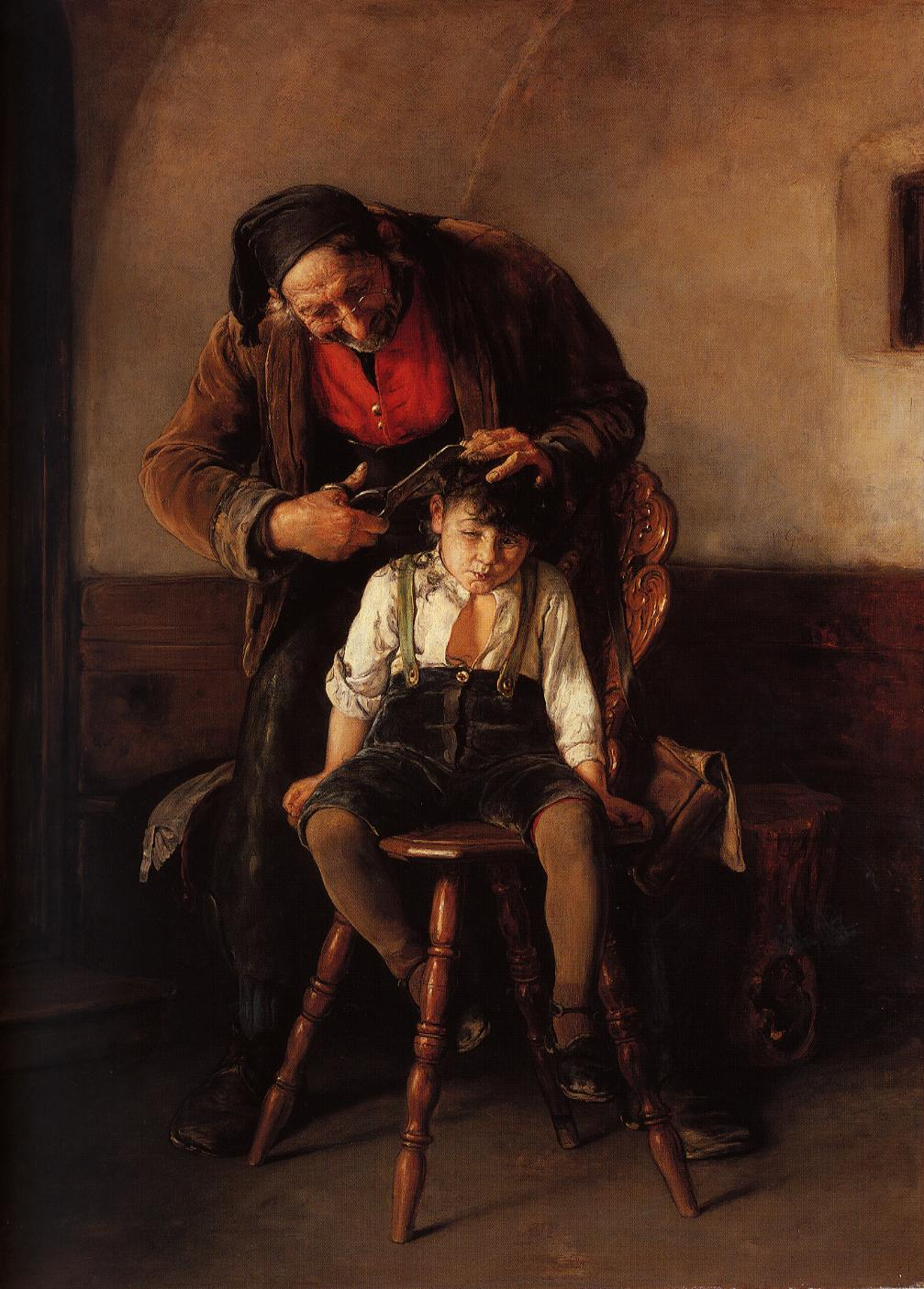
The Barber by Nikolaos Gyzis, 1880

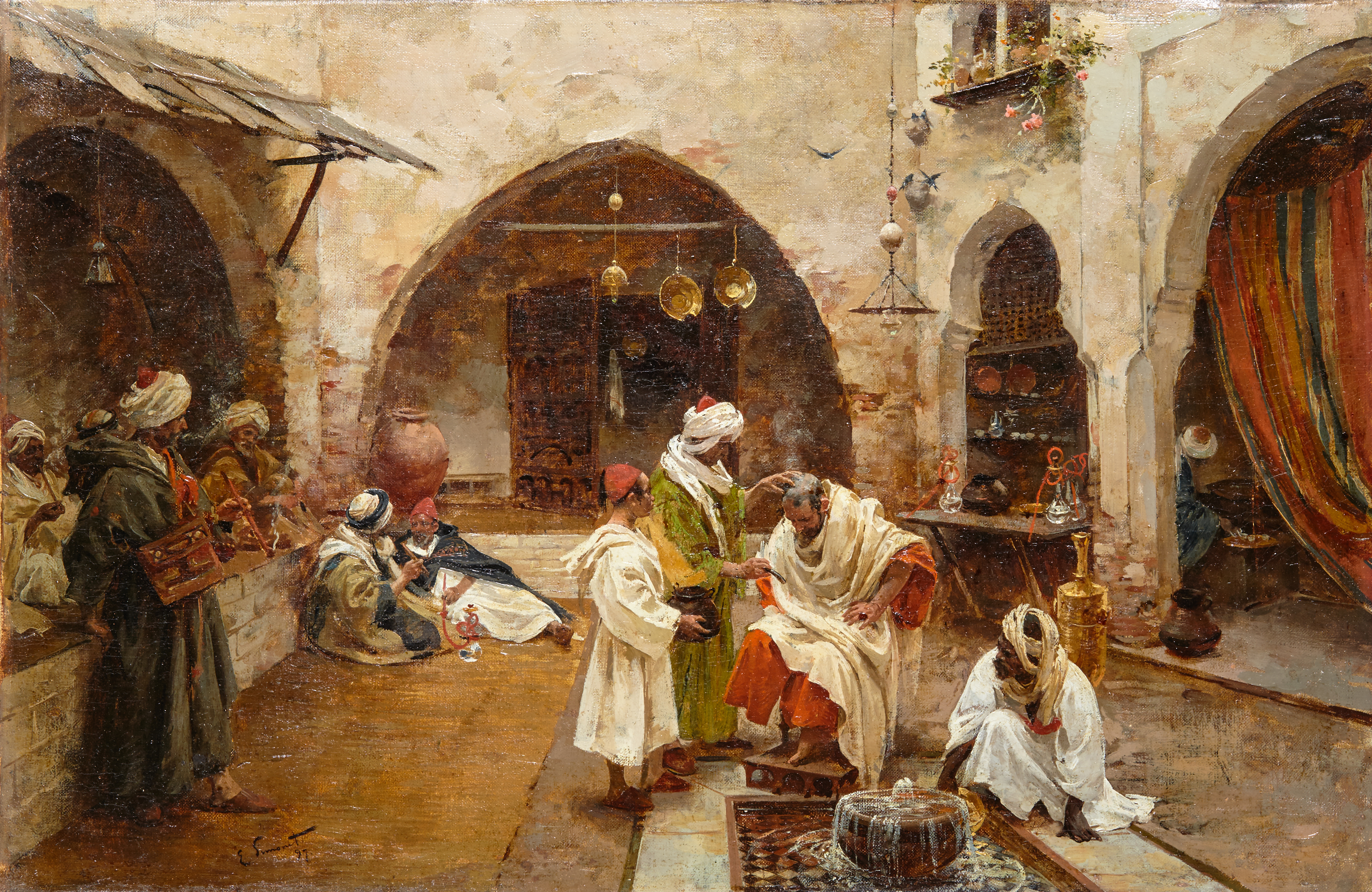
The Barber at the Souk by Enrique Simonet, 1897

A barber shop in Essex County, Ontario, c. 1900, with the photographer visible in the mirror at the back

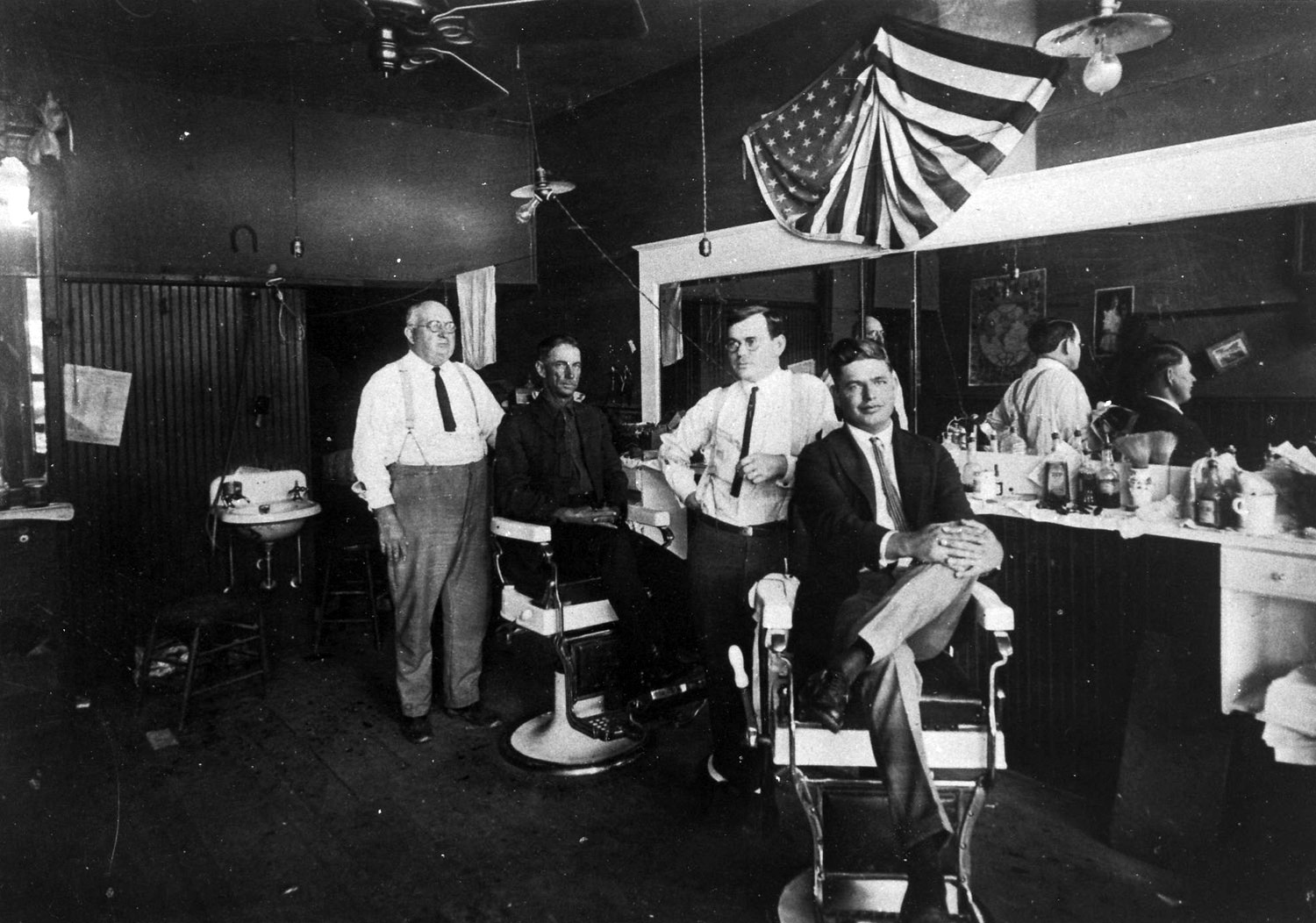
Interior of a barber's shop in Richardson, Texas, c. 1920

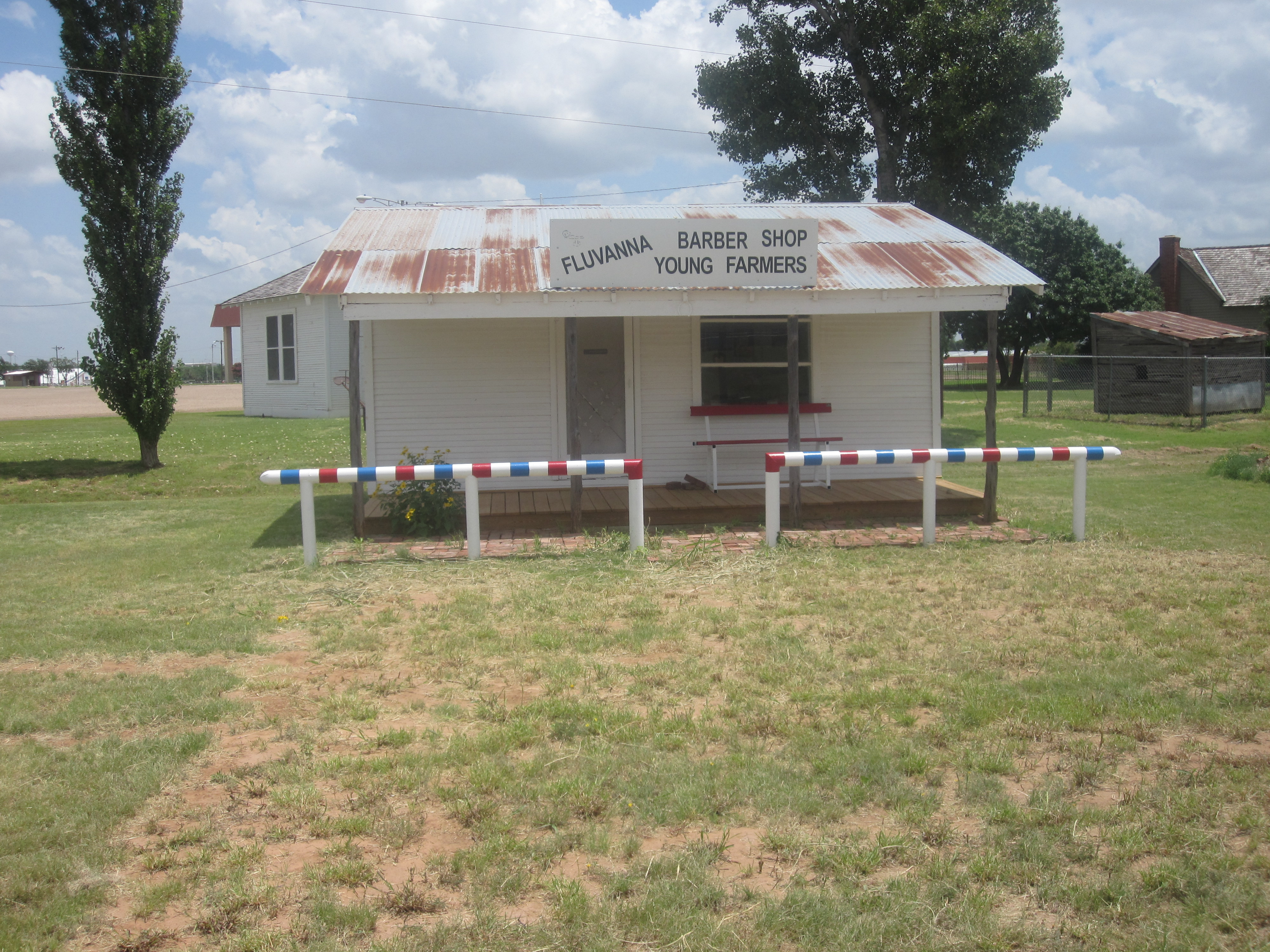
The barbershop in Fluvanna, Texas, was restored in 2010 as part of a pioneer village in Snyder in Scurry County in West Texas.

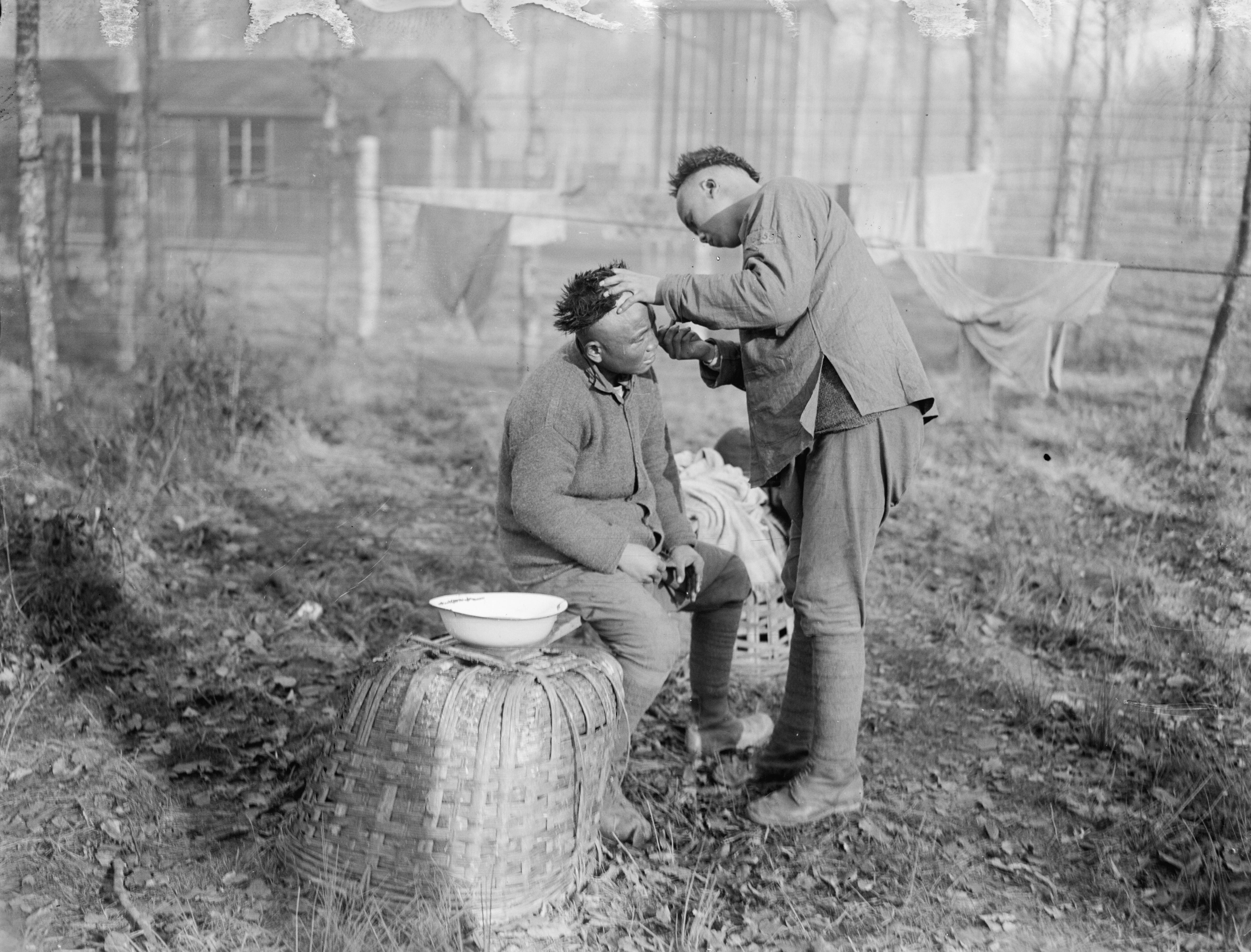
A Chinese barber at work, January 1918

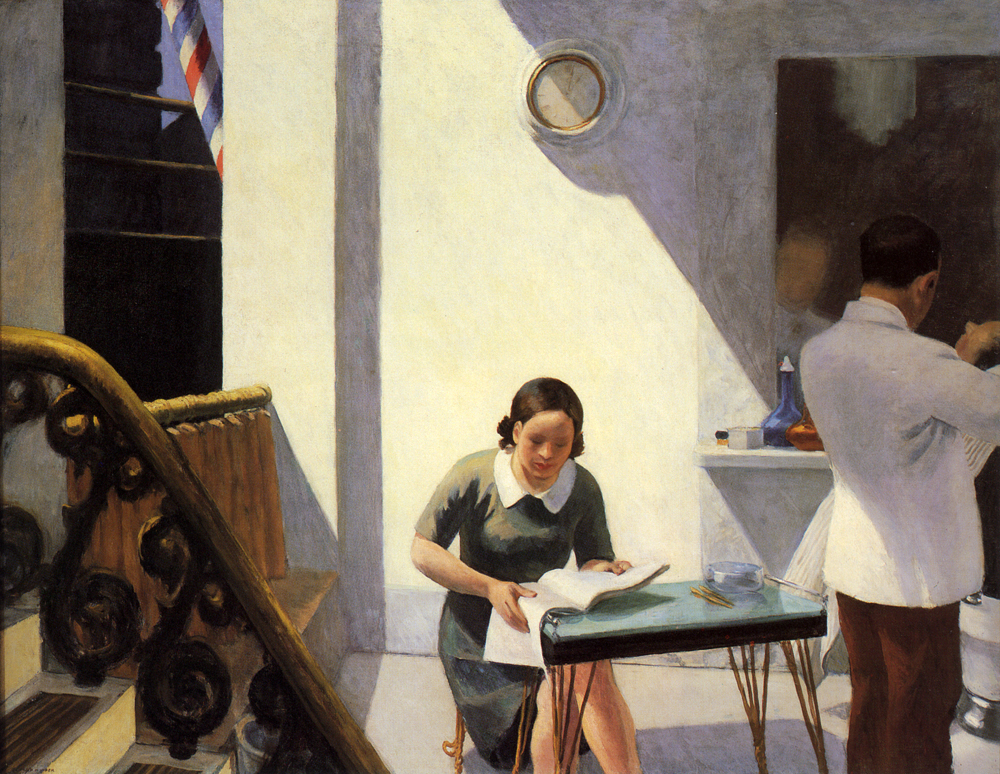
1931 Oil on canvas painting by American realist painter Edward Hopper.

== See also ==
- Barbasol
- Barber paradox
- Barbershop music
- Beauty salon
- Cribs
- Hairstyle
- List of barbers
- List of hairstyles
