= Hair volumizer =

Hair-styling device

Hair volumizer are used to temporarily add volume, body, and shine to thin or flat hair. Used by both men and women, most men tend to use it to make their hair look more dense. Volumizers come in many forms such as shampoos, conditioners, hair texture powder, hair sprays, pomades and lotions.

Hair volumizers contain humectants, which work by attracting moisture from the surrounding areas to the hair strand, thereby swelling the hair and making it look thicker. Various polymers present in the volumizer coat the hair strand, making it look thicker and shiny.

Shampoo and conditioner forms of volumizers are used just like ordinary shampoo or conditioners. The spray and lotion form of volumizers are used on damp hair near the roots of the hair. In order to use a hair volumizer, the person using the product must flip their head downward and gradually blow dry the hair, with the air being blown along the shaft of the hair until the hair is dry. Drying the hair in this position will increase volume and achieve the desired effect.

While the hairstyling products listed above are the most commonly used, there are other types of products as well. Serums, leave-in conditioner, clays, hair tonic, hair dry powder shampoo, and heat protection sprays are frequently used hairstyling products in salons and homes across the country.
