= Hair conditioner =

Hair care product

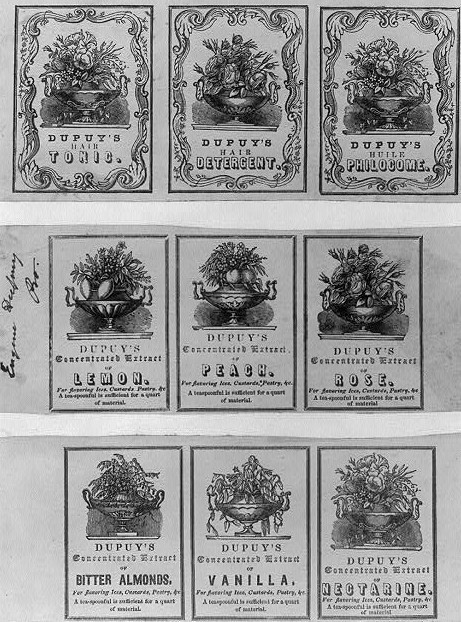
A 19th-century advertisement for hair care products

Hair conditioner is a hair care cosmetic product used to improve the feel, texture, appearance and manageability of hair. Its main purpose is to reduce friction between strands of hair to allow smoother brushing or combing, which might otherwise damage the fibres. Because the hair shaft is made of dead cells that cannot renew themselves, conditioners do not repair hair biologically; they deposit material that coats the fibre and fills damaged areas of the cuticle, leaving a smoother surface. Various other benefits are often advertised, such as hair repair, strengthening, or a reduction in split ends.

Conditioners are available in a wide range of forms, including viscous liquids, gels and creams, as well as thinner lotions and sprays. Hair conditioner is usually used after the hair has been washed with shampoo, because the anionic surfactants that clean hair also strip surface lipids and leave the fibre rougher and more negatively charged. It is applied and worked into the hair and may either be rinsed out a short time later or left in.

== History ==
For centuries, natural oils have been used to condition human hair.

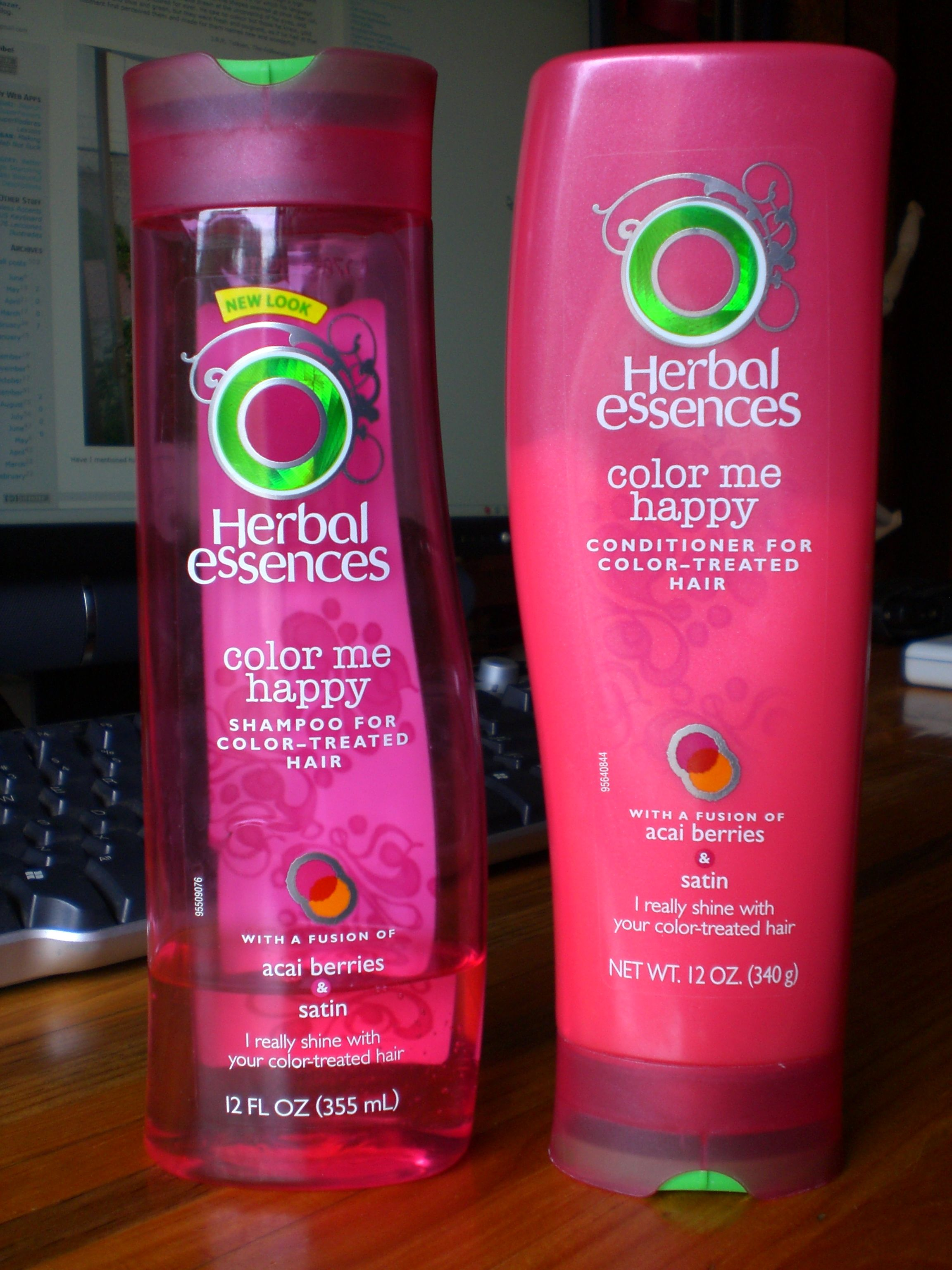
A bottle of modern-day hair conditioner by Clairol (right)

Macassar oil, a scented hair dressing sold from the 1790s by the London barber Alexander Rowland and one of the first products in Britain to be advertised nationally, was widely used by men through much of the 19th century. The oil transferred readily from the hair to furniture, and from about 1850 washable cloths known as antimacassars were placed over the backs and arms of chairs and sofas to protect the upholstery.

Modern hair conditioner is commonly said to date from the turn of the 20th century, when the Edouard Pinaud company presented a product called Brilliantine at the 1900 Exposition Universelle in Paris, intended to soften men's hair, beards and moustaches. Since then, silicones, fatty alcohols, quaternary ammonium compounds and polymers have largely displaced simple oils, delivering a conditioning effect without the greasiness or weight of the earlier dressings.

== Mechanism ==
The outermost layer of the hair shaft, the cuticle, is covered by a lipid film of 18-methyleicosanoic acid bound to the underlying keratin by thioester linkages, which makes an undamaged fibre hydrophobic and low in friction. Weathering, bleaching, dyeing and heat styling remove this layer and oxidise cystine residues to cysteic acid, leaving a surface that is hydrophilic, polar and more negatively charged. The isoelectric point of hair is acidic, at about pH 3.7, so at the pH of most cosmetic products the fibre carries a net negative charge; damaged hair has a lower isoelectric point and so a higher density of negative sites, and adsorbs more conditioner.

Conditioning is achieved by at least one of three routes: neutralising the fibre's negative surface charge by adsorbing cationic compounds; lubricating the cuticle by restoring its hydrophobic character; and diffusing small proteins into the shaft. Cationic surfactants adsorb head-first onto the negatively charged fibre and leave their hydrophobic alkyl chains pointing outwards. This flattens the cuticle scales against one another, reduces static electricity and flyaway, and creates a surface onto which oils and silicones can subsequently deposit. Surfactants with longer alkyl chains generally give larger reductions in wet combing force, an effect attributed to stronger van der Waals interactions.

== Types ==
Conditioning products differ mainly in how concentrated they are and how long they are left on the hair.

- Rinse-out conditioners, also called instant conditioners or creme rinse, are the most common type. They are applied to wet hair after shampooing, left for a few minutes and rinsed off. The short contact time limits how much conditioning they impart, but they reduce the dryness and tangling caused by washing and improve manageability.
- Deep conditioners, also called hair masks, are thicker and more concentrated and are intended for severely damaged or very dry hair. They are typically left in for about 20 to 30 minutes; applying heat lifts the cuticle scales and increases penetration of the conditioning agents.
- Leave-in conditioners are applied to wet or dry hair before drying or styling and are not rinsed out. They are formulated to be light enough not to weigh the hair down, and usually contain silicones or other lightweight film-forming polymers such as polyvinylpyrrolidone that coat the fibre, reduce static electricity, and give some thermal and photo-protection.
- Conditioning shampoos, including "2-in-1" products, combine cleansing and conditioning in a single step. Their effect is weaker than that of a dedicated conditioner, partly because the anionic detergents and cationic conditioning agents can react to form water-insoluble complexes.
- Cleansing conditioners are used in place of shampoo, a practice known as co-washing. They cleanse with milder surfactants and are used mainly on dry, sensitive, over-processed or textured hair. Because they clean less thoroughly, they are generally alternated with a clarifying shampoo, and insoluble silicones are avoided to limit build-up.
- Powder conditioners are concentrated dry formulations activated with water before or during use and may contain conditioning agents, emulsifiers, fatty alcohols, and other ingredients commonly used in rinse-off conditioners.

== Ingredients ==
Hair conditioners are usually formulated from several classes of ingredient acting together.

- Acidifiers, most often organic acids such as citric acid, keep the product acidic. Because the isoelectric point of hair is about 3.7, an acidic product lowers the fibre's net negative charge, tightens the cuticle and reduces frizz.
- Cationic surfactants, also called quaternary ammonium compounds, are the principal conditioning agents. Because their hydrophilic ends bind strongly to keratin they are not completely rinsed away, and their hydrophobic ends then act as the new hair surface. Examples include cetrimonium chloride, behentrimonium chloride and stearalkonium chloride.
- Cationic polymers bind to the fibre and act as antistatic and film-forming agents. Commonly used examples include Polyquaternium-10, a quaternised cellulose, and guar hydroxypropyltrimonium chloride.
- Silicones, most often dimethicone, form a thin film that fills cuticle defects, lowers friction between fibres and increases shine. Water-insoluble silicones condition strongly but can accumulate on the hair, while volatile silicones such as cyclopentasiloxane evaporate after application and leave a lighter finish. Cationic bridging agents are commonly added to help silicone deposit on negatively charged hair.
- Fatty alcohols such as cetyl and stearyl alcohol are used at high concentration alongside cationic surfactants, acting as lubricants and giving the product its body.
- Hydrolysed proteins, sometimes called reconstructors, are low-molecular-weight protein fragments used to strengthen damaged hair. Their effectiveness depends less on the source of the protein than on its size and its consequent ability to enter the fibre: in one study, wool-derived keratin peptides of about 221 and 2,577 Da penetrated deep into the cortex of relaxed textured hair, whereas a fraction of about 75,000 Da mainly adsorbed onto the surface. The effect is temporary, as excess protein is removed by shampooing.
- Moisturizers and humectants hold moisture in the hair. Panthenol, a small molecule that penetrates the fibre, has been shown to interact with hair proteins and to increase break stress and elastic modulus.
- Sequestrants such as EDTA and citric acid bind calcium, magnesium and other metal ions taken up from hard water, which otherwise deposit on the fibre; hair washed in hard water shows measurably higher calcium and magnesium content and a rougher surface than hair washed in distilled water.
- UV filters are added to limit protein degradation and colour loss caused by sunlight, which is a significant cause of hair weathering. Benzophenone-4 and ethylhexyl methoxycinnamate are among those used; substantive filters such as cinnamidopropyltrimonium chloride are favoured because they bind to the fibre and are not readily rinsed away.
- Thermal protectants are film-forming polymers intended to shield the hair from blow-drying, curling irons and flat irons, which can operate above 200 °C. Pretreatment with polymers such as VP/acrylates/lauryl methacrylate copolymer, polyquaternium-55, and a polyelectrolyte complex of PVM/MA copolymer with polyquaternium-28 has been shown to reduce breakage on combing and to limit thermal degradation of keratin.
- Preservatives protect the product from spoilage by microorganisms during its shelf life.

== See also ==
- Anointing
- Brilliantine
- Brylcreem
- Macassar oil
- Pomade
- Shampoo
