= Microbacterium hatanonis =

Scientific classification
- Domain: Bacteria
- Kingdom: Bacillati
- Phylum: Actinomycetota
- Class: Actinomycetia
- Order: Micrococcales
- Family: Microbacteriaceae
- Genus: Microbacterium
- Species: M. hatanonis

Binomial name
- Microbacterium hatanonis Bakir et al. 2008

Type strain
- DSM 19179; FCC-01; JCM 14558

Species of bacterium

Microbacterium hatanonis is a bacterium of the family Microbacteriaceae. The type strain was discovered living in hair spray.

M. hatanonis was selected as one of "The Top 10 New Species" described in 2008 by The International Institute for Species Exploration at Arizona State University and an international committee of taxonomists.

== Etymology ==
Named in honor of Dr. Kazunori Hatano, "for his contribution to the understanding of the genus Microbacterium."
