= Hair texture powder =

Hairstyling product

Hair texture powder is a hairstyling product.

== History ==
Hair styling powder, often regarded as a modern innovation, can actually trace its origins back to the late 16th and early 17th century, powdered substances, such as starch or flour, were employed to enhance wigs and natural hair, during the reign of Henry IV of France. However, the use of hair powder in this period differed significantly from today's applications.

By the 18th century, the use of hair powder became a status symbol, particularly in France and England. Both men and women from the upper classes used white or tinted powders to style wigs or their natural hair. Hair powder usage began to decline after the French Revolution, as more natural hairstyles came into vogue, and taxes on hair powder were introduced.

== Modern usage ==
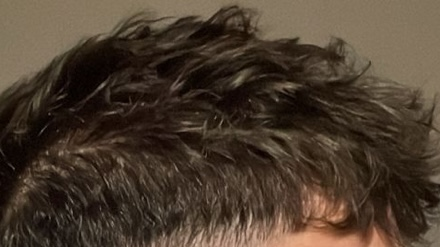
Short hair styled with hair texture powder

In contemporary hairstyling, texture powder is widely used to create volume and body in both men's and women's hairstyles. Unlike the heavier powders of the past, modern formulations are much lighter and are designed to be virtually invisible in the hair. These powders are often made from ingredients such as silica, rice starch, or other fine particulate materials, which help create grip and separation without leaving a residue.

Texture powders are popular for their versatility and ease of use. They are particularly effective for those with fine or thinning hair, as they add thickness and lift at the roots. Additionally, texture powder can be used to create styles that require hold and definition without the stiffness associated with hair spray or hair gel.

== Types ==
Volumising powders are designed specifically to boost volume at the roots, providing lift and creating a fuller appearance. Matte powders, on the other hand, work to reduce shine and give the hair a matte (non-glossy) finish, making them ideal for modern, tousled styles. Texturing powders add grit and definition to the hair, making them especially useful for achieving a messy or textured look.

== See also ==
- Wig powder
- Hair clay
- Dry shampoo
- Pomade
