= Polyvinylpyrrolidone =

Water-soluble polymer

- 150pxc

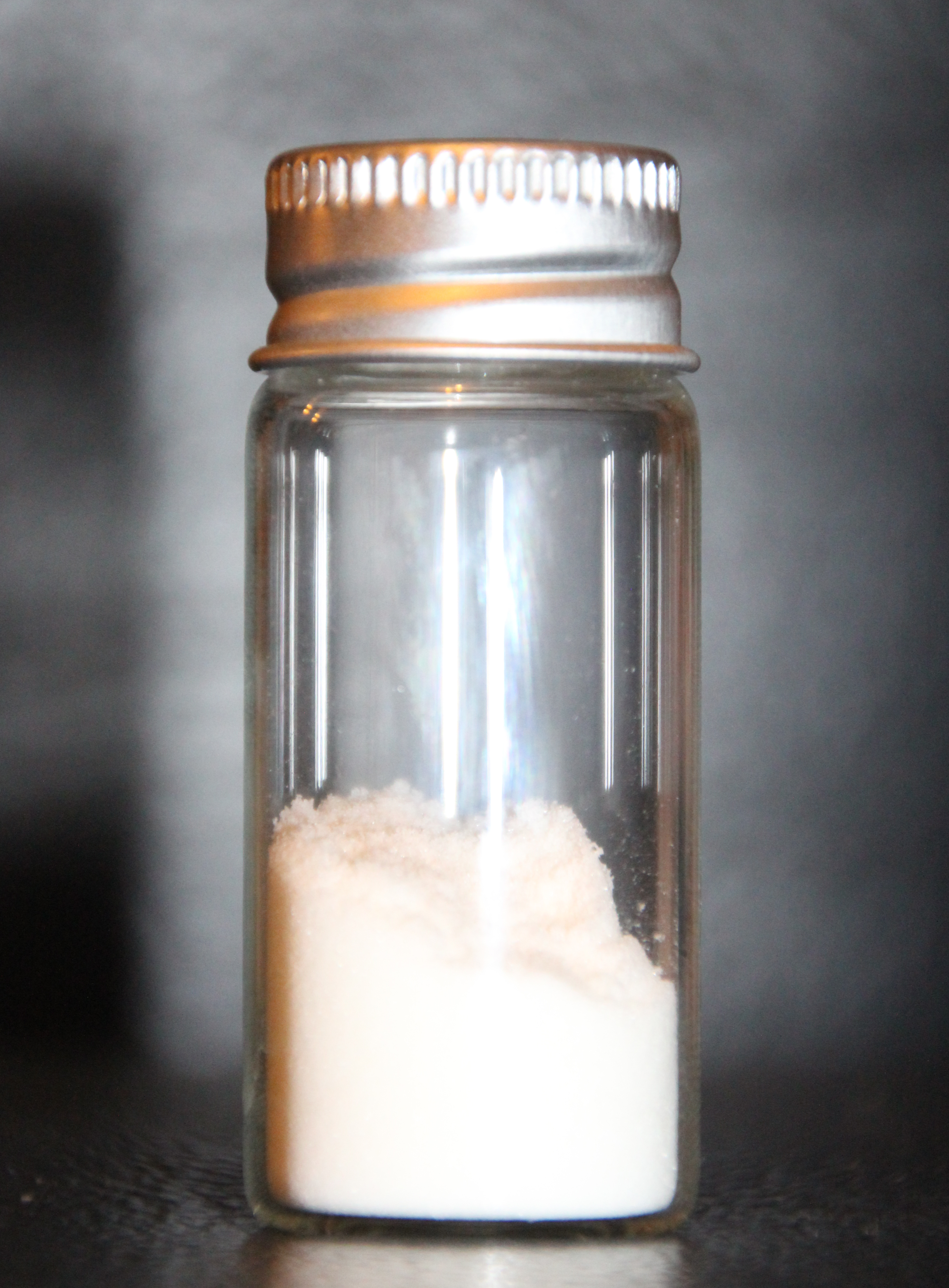

Names
- IUPAC name Poly(1-Ethenylpyrrolidin-2-one)
- Other names PVP, PNVP, povidone, polyvidone, kollidon Poly[1-(2-oxo-1-pyrrolidinyl)ethylen] 1-Ethenyl-2-pyrrolidon homopolymer 1-Vinyl-2-pyrrolidinon-polymere; Poly-N-vinylpyrrolidine; Poly(N-vinylpyrrolidone)

Identifiers
CAS Number	9003-39-8
3D model (JSmol)	Interactive image
Abbreviations	PVP, NVP, PNVP
ChEMBL	ChEMBL1909074
ChemSpider	none
ECHA InfoCard	100.111.937
E number	E1201 (additional chemicals)
UNII	2S7830E561
CompTox Dashboard (EPA)	DTXSID0025941
- SMILES: N1(C(CCC1)=O)[C@@H](C*)*

Properties
Chemical formula	(C_{6}H_{9}NO)_{n}
Molar mass	2,500–2,500,000 g·mol^{−1}
Appearance	white to light yellow, hygroscopic, amorphous powder
Density	1.2 g/cm^{3}
Melting point	150 to 180 °C (302 to 356 °F; 423 to 453 K) (glass temperature)
- Except where otherwise noted, data are given for materials in their standard state (at 25 °C [77 °F], 100 kPa). verify (what is ?) Infobox references

Polyvinylpyrrolidone (PVP), also commonly called povidone, is a water-soluble polymer compound made from the monomer N-vinylpyrrolidone. PVP is available in a range of molecular weights and related viscosities, and can be selected according to the desired application properties.

== Uses ==
=== Medical ===
Structure of povidone-iodine complex, a common antiseptic

There are high-purity injectable grades of PVP available on the market, for specific use in intravenous, intramuscular, and subcutaneous applications.

PVP is a frequently used binder in pharmaceutical tablet formulations. Pharmacokinetic studies in humans and various laboratory animal models indicate no to very little systemic absorption of PVP following oral administration.

PVP added to iodine forms a complex called povidone-iodine that possesses disinfectant properties. This complex is used in various products such as solutions, ointment, pessaries, liquid soaps, and surgical scrubs. It is sold under the trade names Pyodine and Betadine, among others.

It is used in pleurodesis (fusion of the pleura because of incessant pleural effusions). For this purpose, povidone-iodine is as effective and safe as talc, and may be preferred because of its easy availability and low cost.

PVP is used in some contact lenses and their packaging solutions. It reduces friction, thus acting as a lubricant, or wetting agent, built into the lens. Examples of this use include Bausch & Lomb's Ultra contact lenses with MoistureSeal Technology, Air Optix contact lens packaging solution (as an ingredient called "copolymer 845"), and Johnson & Johnson's Acuvue contact lenses.

PVP is used as a lubricant in some eye drops, e.g. Bausch & Lomb's Soothe.

PVP was used as a plasma volume expander for trauma victims after the 1950s. It is not preferred as a volume expander due to its ability to provoke histamine release and also interfere with blood grouping.

=== Technical ===
PVP is also used in many technical applications:

- as a special additive for batteries, ceramics, fiberglass, inks, and inkjet paper, and in the chemical-mechanical planarization process
- as an emulsifier and disintegrant for solution polymerization
- to increase resolution in photoresists for cathode-ray tubes (CRT)
- in aqueous metal quenching
- for production of membranes, such as dialysis and water purification filters
- as a binder and complexation agent in agricultural applications such as crop protection, seed treatment and coating
- as a thickening agent in tooth whitening gels
- as an aid for increasing the solubility of drugs in liquid and semi-liquid dosage forms (syrups, soft gelatine capsules) and as an inhibitor of recrystallisation
- as an additive to Doro's RNA extraction buffer
- as a liquid-phase dispersion enhancing agent in DOSY NMR
- as a surfactant, reducing agent, shape controlling agent and dispersant in nanoparticle synthesis and their self-assembly
- as a stabilizing agent in all inorganic solar cells

=== Other uses ===
PVP binds to polar molecules exceptionally well, owing to its polarity. This has led to its application in coatings for photo-quality ink-jet papers and transparencies, as well as in inks for inkjet printers.

PVP is also used in personal care products, such as shampoos and toothpastes, in paints, and adhesives that must be moistened, such as old-style postage stamps and envelopes. It has also been used in contact lens solutions and in steel-quenching solutions. PVP is the basis of the early formulas for hair sprays and hair gels, and still continues to be a component of some.

As a food additive, PVP is a stabilizer and has E number E1201. PVPP (crospovidone) is E1202. It is also used in the wine industry as a fining agent for white wine and some beers.

In in-vitro fertilisation laboratories, PVP is used to slow down spermatozoa in order to capture them for e.g. ICSI.

In molecular biology, PVP can be used as a blocking agent during Southern blot analysis as a component of Denhardt's buffer. It is also exceptionally good at absorbing polyphenols during DNA purification. Polyphenols are common in many plant tissues and can deactivate proteins if not removed and therefore inhibit many downstream reactions like PCR.

In microscopy, PVP is useful for making an aqueous mounting medium.

PVP can be used to screen for phenolic properties, as referenced in a 2000 study on the effect of plant extracts on insulin production.

== Safety ==
The U.S. Food and Drug Administration (FDA) has approved this chemical for many uses, and it is generally recognized as safe (GRAS). PVP is included in the Inactive Ingredient Database for use in oral, topical, and injectable formulations.

However, there have been some documented cases of allergic reactions to PVP/povidone, particularly regarding subcutaneous (applied under the skin) use and situations where the PVP has come in contact with autologous serum (internal blood fluids) and mucous membranes.

Examples of documented allergic reactions:

- A boy had an anaphylactic response after application of PVP-Iodine for treatment of impetigo. He was found to be allergic to the PVP component of the solution.
- A woman had experienced urticaria (hives) from various hair products, later found to contain PVP. The woman had an anaphylactic response after povidone-iodine solution was applied internally during a surgery. She was found to be allergic to PVP.
- A man experiencing anaphylaxis after taking acetaminophen tablets orally was found to be allergic to PVP.
- A man experiencing urticaria from various products, then thought to be anaphylactic to penicillin, was actually allergic to PVP.

Additionally, Povidone is commonly used in conjunction with other chemicals. Some of these, such as iodine and penicillin, for example, are blamed for allergic responses. Yet subsequent testing results in some patients show no signs of allergy to the suspect chemical. Allergies attributed to these other chemicals may possibly be caused by the PVP instead.

== Properties ==
PVP is soluble in water and other polar solvents. For example, it is soluble in various alcohols, such as methanol and ethanol, as well as in more exotic solvents like the deep eutectic solvent formed by choline chloride and urea (Relin). When dry it is a light flaky hygroscopic powder, readily absorbing up to 40% of its weight in atmospheric water. In solution, it has excellent wetting properties and readily forms films. This makes it good as a coating or an additive to coatings.

A 2014 study found fluorescent properties of PVP and its oxidized hydrolyzate.

== History ==
Povidone was first synthesized by BASF chemist Walter Reppe, and a patent was filed in 1939 for one of the derivatives of acetylene chemistry. PVP was initially used as a blood plasma substitute and later in a wide variety of applications in medicine, pharmacy, cosmetics and industrial production. BASF continues to make PVP, including a pharmaceutical portfolio under the brand name of Kollidon.

== See also ==
- 2-Pyrrolidone
- Peter DeMarco
