= Brilliantine =

Hairstyling product

Brilliantine /ˈbrɪljəntiːn/ is a hair-grooming product intended to soften men's hair, including beards and moustaches, and give it a glossy, well-groomed appearance. It was created at the turn of the 20th century by French perfumier Édouard Pinaud (also known as Ed. Pinaud).

In English-speaking markets, Pinaud's name is associated with the Clubman tradename in men's toiletries. He presented a product he called Brillantine (from the French brillant meaning "brilliant") at the 1900 Exposition Universelle in Paris. It consisted of a perfumed and colored oily liquid.

Brillantine was used in Quebec, Canada as the French title for the film Grease.

== See also ==
- Brylcreem
- Hair conditioner
- Pomade
- Macassar oil
