= Moustache wax =

Stiff pomade applied to a moustache

Gentleman with a waxed moustache ca. 1910 wearing a Homburg hat and pince nez

Moustache wax is a stiff pomade applied to a moustache as a grooming aid to hold the hairs in place, especially at the extremities. The required product strength (or stiffness) is based on whisker length and the desired style. It can also have restorative properties, which become more important as the hair length increases. The wax is usually scented and sometimes pigmented with dyes; high end products utilize various combinations of iron oxide to create darker shades.

Generally less than a fingernail of wax is used when applied. More sophisticated recipes may include gum arabic and a soap, scent and colouring may also be added if desired, to either strengthen the hold or for comfort.

== Common ingredients ==
- Beeswax
- Coconut oil or shea nut butter (or any saturated vegetable oil, solid at room temperature, and not prone to rancidity)
- Lanolin
- Petroleum jelly (Vaseline)
- Gum arabic or pine resin
- Scented oils
- Tallow

In addition to the wax itself, more-experienced "waxers" use a moustache wax remover and conditioner. The reason for this is that warm soapy water (used by the novice) removes wax build-up but damages the bristles by stripping them of natural oils, so an oil‑based moustache wax remover, that may double as a leave‑in conditioner, is preferred by some. (Note: Taken from Beard and Moustache Conditioning Manual For the Whiskered Warrior to the Everyday Gent)

== See also ==
- Hair wax
