= Hair clay =

Product for easier management of hair

Hair clay, or simply clay in the hair industry, is a hair product that has very similar characteristics to hair wax. Clay additionally detangles the hair and gives it softness. Clay often either has a matte shine or little to no shine, meaning a stylist can achieve a very natural and dull look.

== Clay products ==
The defining trait of hair clays is the usage of real clays in the product. Typically, the clays will give the product a gritty feeling in the hand, and make the product thicker and heavier than other creams or pastes. There are many hair clay products on the market. Most clay products are considered salon grade, and the price of these products is usually more expensive than normal consumer level hair wax and gel.

Clay products have a lot of good features, however they leave residual clay when too much is applied. That is, they can leave visible streak marks on the hair if applied poorly.
