= Humectant =

Water-absorbing substance used to keep things moist

A humectant /hjuːˈmɛktənt/ is a hygroscopic (water-absorbing) substance used to keep things moist. Humectants are used in many products, including food, cosmetics, medicines and pesticides. When used as a food additive, a humectant has the effect of keeping moisture in the food. Humectants are sometimes used as a component of antistatic coatings for plastics.

A humectant attracts and retains the moisture in the air nearby via absorption, drawing the water vapor into or beneath the organism's or object's surface. This is the opposite use of a hygroscopic material where it is used as a desiccant to draw moisture away.

The stratum corneum layer of the skin creates humectants such as pyroglutamic acid as part of its natural moisturizing factor (NMF).

In pharmaceuticals and cosmetics, humectants can be used in topical dosage forms to increase the solubility of a chemical compound's active ingredients, increasing the active ingredients' ability to penetrate skin, or its activity time. This hydrating property can also be needed to counteract a dehydrating active ingredient (e.g., soaps, corticoids, and some alcohols), which is why humectants are common ingredients in a wide range of cosmetic and personal care products that make moisturization claims (e.g., hair conditioners, body lotions, face or body cleansers, lip balms, and eye creams).

== Chemistry ==
A humectant is often a molecule with several hydrophilic groups, most often hydroxyl groups; however, amines and carboxyl groups, sometimes esterified, can be encountered as well (its affinity to form hydrogen bonds with molecules of water is the crucial trait).

== Examples ==
Examples of humectants include:

- Propylene glycol, such as glycerol, sorbitol, propylene glycol, butylene glycol, and xylitol
- Organic acids and related compounds, such as lactic acid, pyroglutamic acid, and urea
- Sugars and sugar-containing materials, such as honey, glucose syrup, and molasses
- Inorganic salts, such as lithium chloride

== Uses ==
Humectants are used to retain moisture, control water activity, improve product texture, and reduce drying in products such as foods, cosmetics, oral-care products, medicines, and tobacco products. In different applications, they may help preserve softness, maintain consistency, extend shelf life, or support the performance of active ingredients.

=== Food additives ===
Some common humectants used in food are honey and glucose syrup both for their water absorption and sweet flavor. Glucose syrup also helps to retain the shape of the product better than other alternatives, for a longer period of time. In addition, some humectants are recognized in different countries as good food additives because of the increase in nutritional value that they provide, such as sodium hexametaphosphate.

In order to gauge a compound's humectancy, scientists will put it through a series of tests, often involving water absorption. In tests involving toothpaste, the process is also coupled with a sweetness test and a crystallization test. When humectancy is being assessed in different products, testers will compare the results to other humectants that are already used in those products, in order to evaluate efficiency.

Some of these humectants are seen in non-ionic polyols like sucrose, glycerin or glycerol and its triester (triacetin). These humectant food additives are used for the purpose of controlling viscosity and texture. Humectants also add bulk, retain moisture, reduce water activity, and improve softness. A main advantage of humectant food additives is that, since they are non-ionic, they are not expected to influence any variation of the pH aqueous systems.

Glycerol or glycerin humectants undergo a pretreatment process using saponification, bleaching, ion exchange exclusion, both cationic and ionic ion exchanges, vacuum flash evaporation, thin film distillation, and heating to produce a 100% pure glycerol.

Humectants are used in stabilization of food products and lengthening shelf life through food and moisture control. The available moisture determines microbial activity, physical properties, sensory properties and the rate of chemical changes, that if not controlled, are the cause of reduced shelf life. Examples are dry cereal with semi-moist raisins, ice cream in a cone, chocolate, hard candy with liquid centers and cheese. Humectants are used to stabilize the moisture content of foodstuffs and are incorporated as food additives. Humectants are also used in military technology for the use of MREs and other military rations. A number of food items always need to be moist. The use of humectants reduces the available water, thus reducing bacterial activity. They are used for safety issues, for quality, and to have a longer shelf-life in food products.

An example of where humectants are used to keep food moist is in products like toothpaste as well as certain kinds of cookies. Regional kinds of cookies often use humectants as a binding agent in order to keep moisture locked into the center of the cookie rather than have it evaporate out. Humectants are favored in food products because of their ability to keep consumable goods moist and increase shelf-life.

=== Personal care and cosmetics ===
In moisturizers, humectants are commonly distinguished from emollients and occlusives. Humectants are hydrophilic ingredients that attract and retain water in the stratum corneum, while occlusive ingredients reduce water loss from the skin surface and emollients help soften and smooth the skin.

Humectants such as pyroglutamic acid, are part of its natural moisturizing factor (NMF). Artificial humectants are frequently used in oral hygiene products, and cosmetics as a supportive way of increasing and maintaining moisture in the skin and hair, in products including shampoo, conditioner, frizz serum, lotions, creams, lip treatments, cleansers, after-sun lotion, and some soaps or body lotions. As hygroscopic moisturizers, humectants work by attracting water to the upper layer of the skin (stratum corneum). Examples are polyols like erythritol and sorbitol. All humectants have common hydroxyl groups which allow them to participate in hydrogen bonding and attract water. This process attracts moisture from the outer layer of the skin or, in high humidity, from the atmosphere. The moisture is then trapped against the epidermis or the shaft of the hair, depending on where the humectant is applied. Various humectants have different ways of behaving because they differ in water binding capacity at different humidities.

Humectants used in cosmetics include triethylene glycol, tripropylene glycol, propylene glycol, and PPGs. Other popular humectants in cosmetics include glycerin, sorbitol (sugar alcohol), hexylene and butylene glycol, urea, and collagen. Glycerin is one of the most popular humectants used because it produces the desired result fairly frequently and is low in cost. A category of humectants called nanolipidgels allow skin to retain moisture, but also possess antifungal properties. Scientists are also working to discover different types of humectants; a study published in 2011 concluded that extracts from wine cakes have the potential to be used as a humectant in cosmetics.

Humectants have been added to skin moisturizing products to treat xerosis. Some moisturizers tend to weaken the skin barrier function, but studies on xerosis have proven that moisturizers containing humectants increase desired moisturizing effects on the affected area without damage to the skin barrier function. In this xerosis treatments study, some "smarting and stinging" was also reported from the use of humectant-rich treatment products.

When the humectant glycerol was added to soaps for the cleansing of wounds, similar effects were found. There was an increase in moisture in the areas that the soap was applied, however, "further consideration of conditioning the use of glycerol to improve the absorption of exudates from wounds for an advanced wound healing is needed." The healing properties of humectants are therefore uncertain.

Humectants are also added to toothpaste (dentifrice) to stop the product drying out and cracking in the tube. Sorbitol is commonly used as this also contributes a sweet flavour to the toothpaste without contributing to tooth decay.

=== Tobacco products ===
Humectants are used in the manufacturing of some tobacco products, such as cigarettes, e-cigarettes, and self-rolled tobacco. They are used to control and maintain the moisture content of the cut tobacco filler and add flavor. Humectants are vital to the creation of cigarettes. In an examination of waterpipe smoking, researchers worked to identify substances such as formaldehyde, acetaldehyde, and acrolein in the smoke of a waterpipe, discovering that the value of formaldehyde detected in one smoking session was five times higher than that of a regular cigarette. This data demonstrated that increasing amounts of humectants in the unburned tobacco lowered the temperature in the waterpipe head during smoking, so that considerable amounts of toxic substances were present. Further, e-cigarettes produce aerosol by heating a humectant containing nicotine without burning tobacco. Those "vaping" then inhale the aerosol and receive nicotine.

The main health concern regarding e-cigarettes is that their production is not regulated, and there is immense uncertainty of quality control during manufacturing. Self-rolled tobacco contains more humectants, which are added to tobacco to improve taste and keep from drying out. As the humectants burn, they release chemicals such as acrolein. Humectants are found in most cigarettes and are considered one of the most dangerous chemicals found in tobacco.

However, there have been conflicting claims about the degree to which these products warrant a health concern. In a literary study of e-cigarette health risks, 388 different symptoms were reported; mouth and throat concerns generated more negative symptoms than any other group. There are not enough studies or sufficient evidence to suggest that products, particularly the contaminants of the aerosol in e-cigarettes, produce health risks at a concerning level. More research is currently being conducted to find the true dangers of the use of humectants in cigarettes.
