= Hair wax =

Hairstyling product

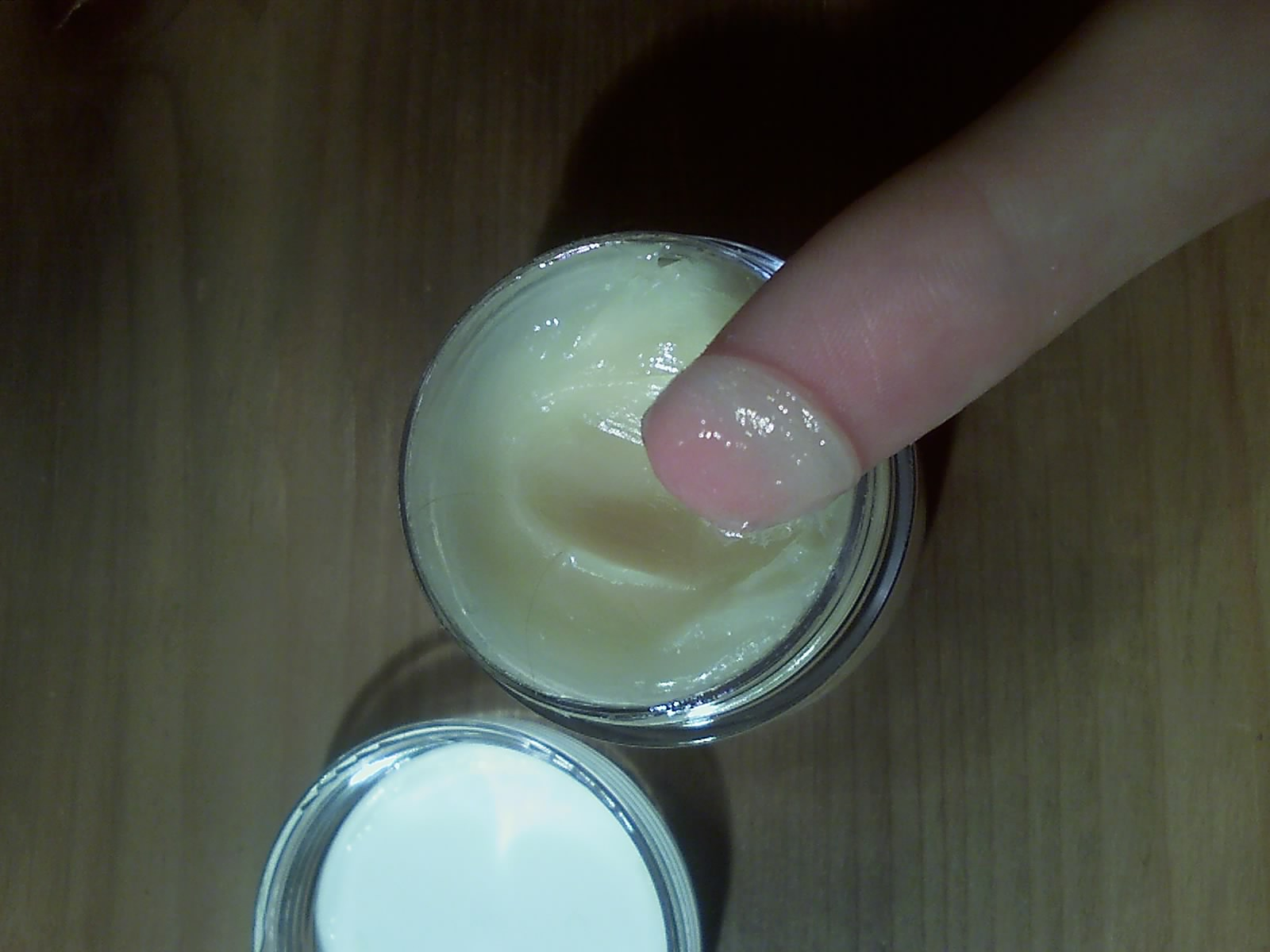
A small tin of hair wax

Hair wax is a thick hairstyling product containing wax, used to assist with holding the hair. In contrast with hair gel, most of which contain alcohol, hair wax remains pliable and has less chance of drying out. It is often sold under names such as pomade, putty, glue, whip, molding gum, or styling paste. The texture, consistency, and purpose of these products varies widely and each has a different purported purpose depending on the manufacturer. Traditionally, pomade is a type of hair wax that also adds shine to one's hair.

Hair wax has been used for many years and a waxy soap-like substance was invented by the ancient Gauls as a hair styling agent and was not used as a cleaning agent until many years later.

== Ingredients ==
The following are some of the ingredients typically found in commercial hair wax products:

- Beeswax
- Candelilla wax
- Carnauba wax
- Castor wax
- Emulsifying wax
- Japan wax
- Lanolin
- Ozokerite

Some stylists prefer making their own blends of hair wax customized for their clientele. Various recipes exist, including some with "secret" ingredients.

== See also ==
- Moustache wax
- Brylcreem
- Murray's Pomade
