= Brylcreem =

British men's hair styling brand

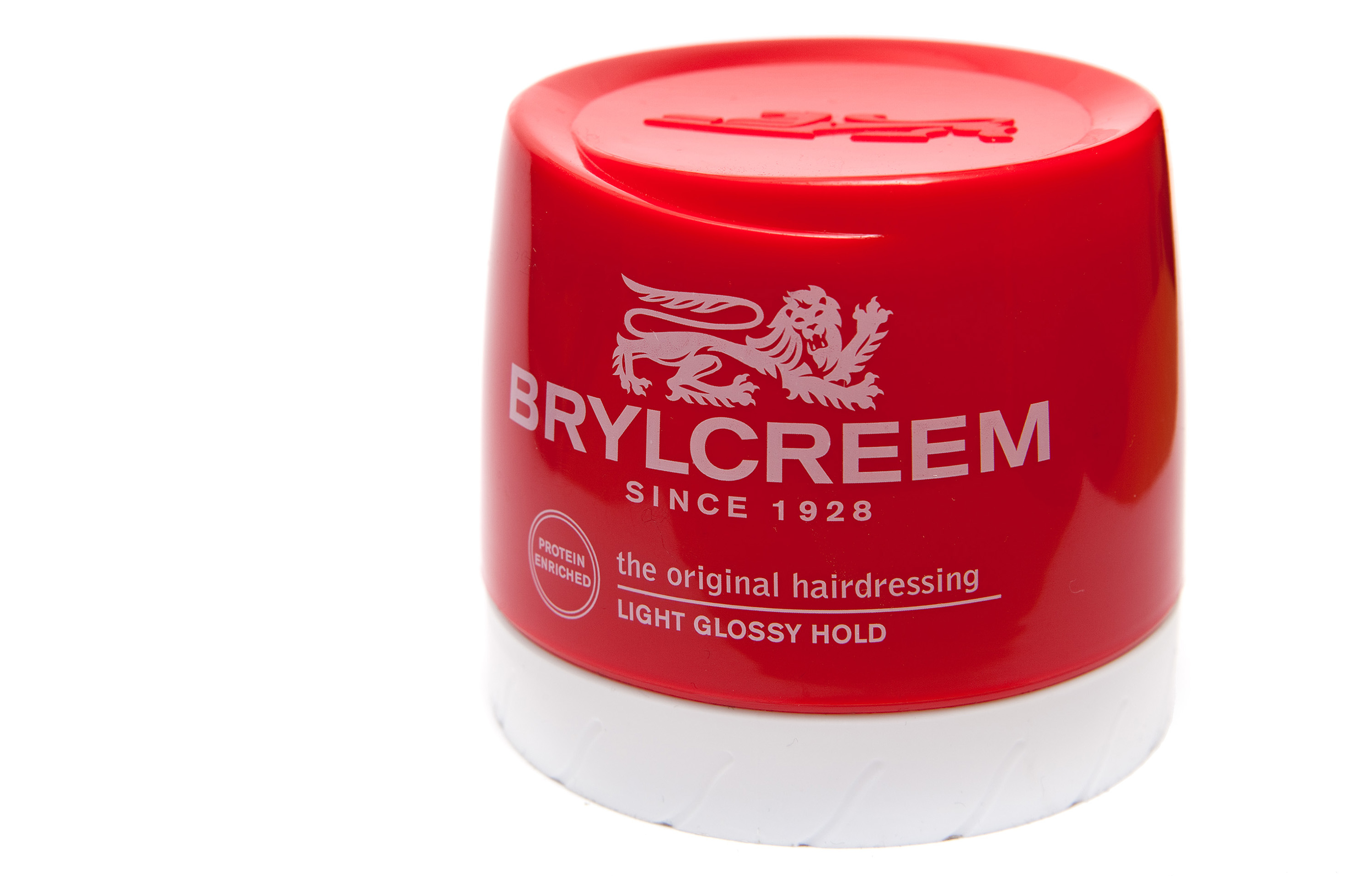
- Inception: 1928; 98 years ago
- Manufacturer: Unilever
- Available: Worldwide
- Current supplier: Combe Incorporated; Unilever; HUL
- Website: Official website

Brylcreem (/ˈbrɪlkriːm/) is a British brand of hair styling products for men. The first Brylcreem product was a hair cream created in 1928 by County Chemicals at the Chemico Works in Bradford Street, Birmingham, England, and is the flagship product of the brand. The cream is an emulsion of water and mineral oil stabilised with beeswax. It is notable for the high shine it provides, which spawned the name of the product, stemming from "brilliantine" and "cream".

== Ownership ==
The British pharmaceutical firm Beecham was the longtime owner of Brylcreem. Sara Lee acquired the personal care unit of SmithKline Beecham in June 1993. In January 2012, the global rights to the Brylcreem brand were sold by Sara Lee Corporation to Unilever.

Brylcreem is marketed in the United States by Combe Incorporated, in Europe by Unilever and in India by Hindustan Unilever Limited. Before Godrej acquired a 51% stake of Sara Lee, in their joint venture Godrej Sara Lee in May 2010, the brand was distributed by Godrej in India.

== Jingle ==
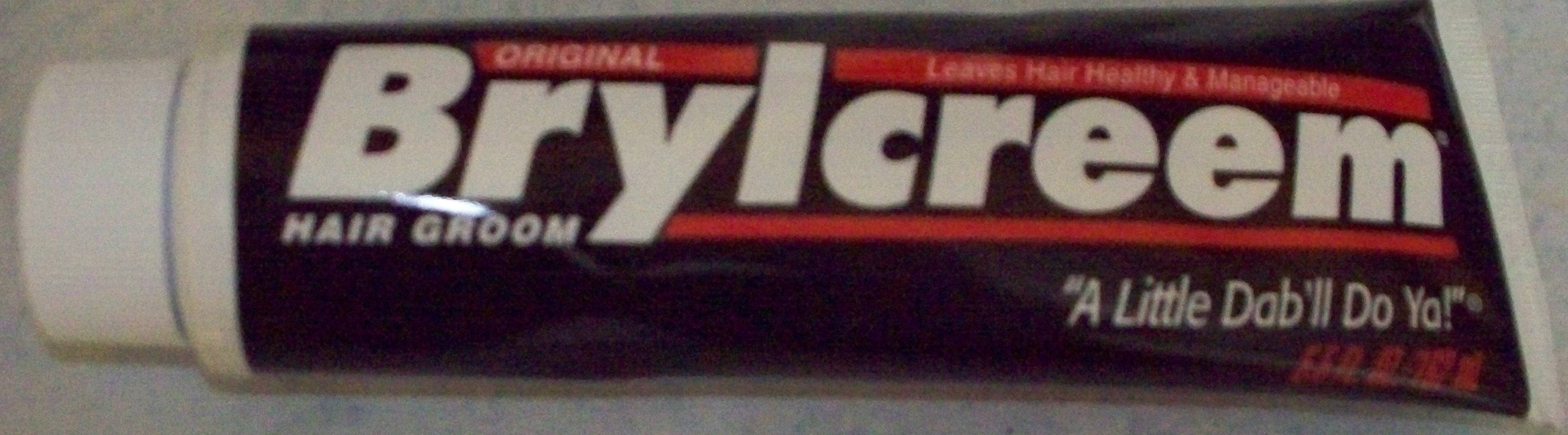
A modern tube of Brylcreem.

It was first advertised on television with the jingle "Brylcreem — A Little Dab'll Do Ya! Brylcreem — You'll look so debonair. Brylcreem — The gals'll all pursue ya; they'll love to run their fingers through your hair!". Another version was "Brylcreem—a little dab will do ya! Use more only if you dare; but watch out! The gals will all pursue ya! They'll love to run their fingers through your hair!"

The jingle was created by Hanley M. Norins of the Young & Rubicam advertising agency. The television advertisement for Brylcreem included a cartoon animation of a man with (initially) shaggy hair, who happily has a little dab applied, and, miraculously, the hair combs and smooths itself.

When the dry look became popular, partly inspired by the unoiled moptops of the Beatles, the last line was changed from "They'll love to run their fingers through your hair", to "They'll love the natural look it gives your hair". Subsequent television advertisements used the mottoes "Grooms without gumming" and later, in the 1970s, in the United Kingdom and Canada, "A little dab of Brylcreem on your hair gives you the Brylcreem bounce".

== Advertising controversy ==
In November 1996, a British television advert for Brylcreem shampoo was banned by the Independent Television Commission (ITC) after receiving a letter from a viewer that said it had triggered an epileptic fit in them, as well as a letter from another viewer fearing that epileptic fits would occur from viewing the advert. The commercial featured a man's experience of a nightclub with flashing strobe lights. The ITC, who enforced guidelines to protect viewers with epilepsy, found that the advert did not meet these guidelines.

== Notable users and popular culture ==
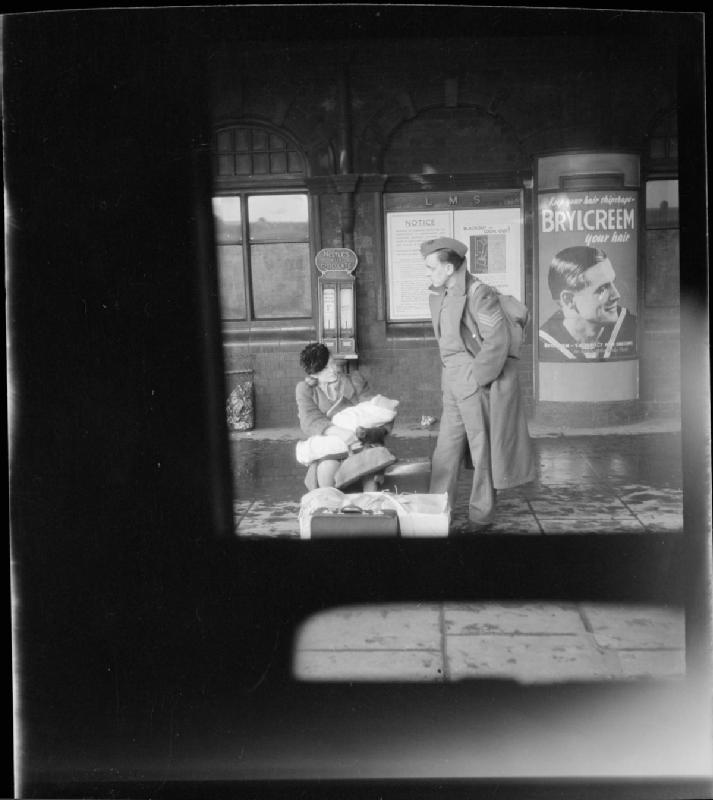
Brylcreem advertisement at a railway station in England in 1944 with the slogan, "Keep your hair shipshape - Brylcreem your hair".

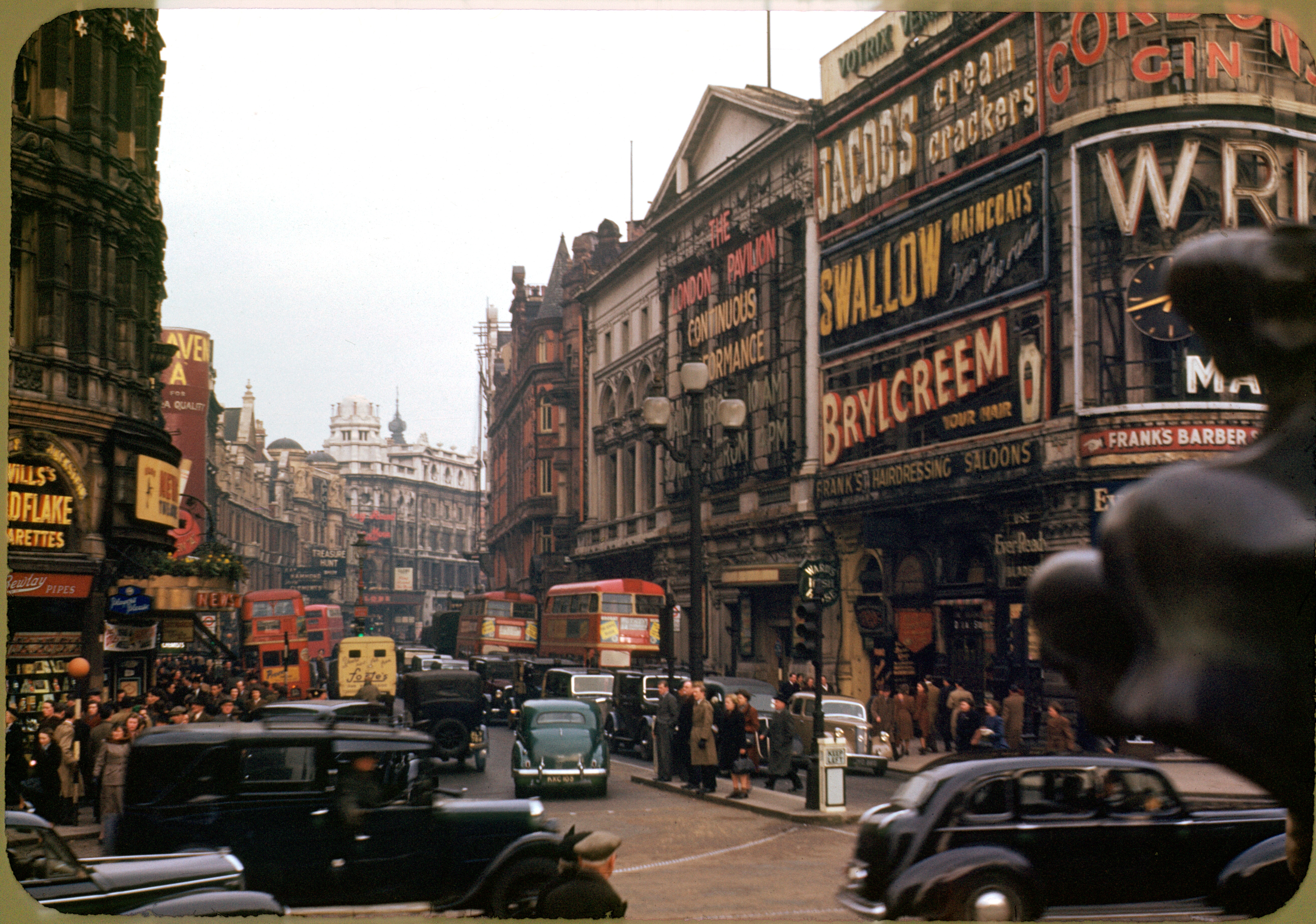
Brylcreem advertised (right) in Shaftesbury Avenue, London c. 1949

- During the Second World War, members of the RAF became known as "Brylcreem boys". While there is a popular belief that it was intended as an insult by other branches of the forces due to the RAF's perceived safe and comfortable job back in Britain, in fact the truth is more prosaic: Brylcreem used an image of an RAF airman in their print ads from 1939.
- Denis Compton, the Middlesex and England batsman and Arsenal footballer, was one of the earliest British sportsmen to make serious money from product endorsement when he advertised Brylcreem in the 1940s and 1950s.
- In 1955 Fazal Mahmood was the first Pakistani cricketer to model for Brylcreem. It was the first time a commercial brand had hired a Pakistani cricketer as a model.
- The Brylcreem Boys is a film from 1998, directed and co-written by Terence Ryan, about the internment of Axis and Allied combatants during World War II.
- In the HBO Mafia drama series The Sopranos, mobster Junior Soprano is being investigated for racketeering. He laments, "Federal marshals are so far up my ass I can taste Brylcreem".
- In Mad Men (Season 1, Episode 7), Roger Sterling says to Don Draper regarding their upcoming meeting with members of the Nixon campaign, "It's the G.O.P. They'll never smell it over the stench of Brylcreem."
- In the opening lines of the 2018 Idles single "Never Fight A Man With A Perm", Brylcreem is mentioned alongside creatine and cocaine as a signifier for toxic hypermasculinity.

== Slogans ==
- Dipakai Pria, Disukai Wanita (Used by Men, Liked by Women)

== See also ==
- Brilliantine
- Hair gel
- Hair wax
- Jheri curl
- Macassar oil
- Murray's Pomade
- Pomade
