= Hair gel =

Gel used as a hairstyling product

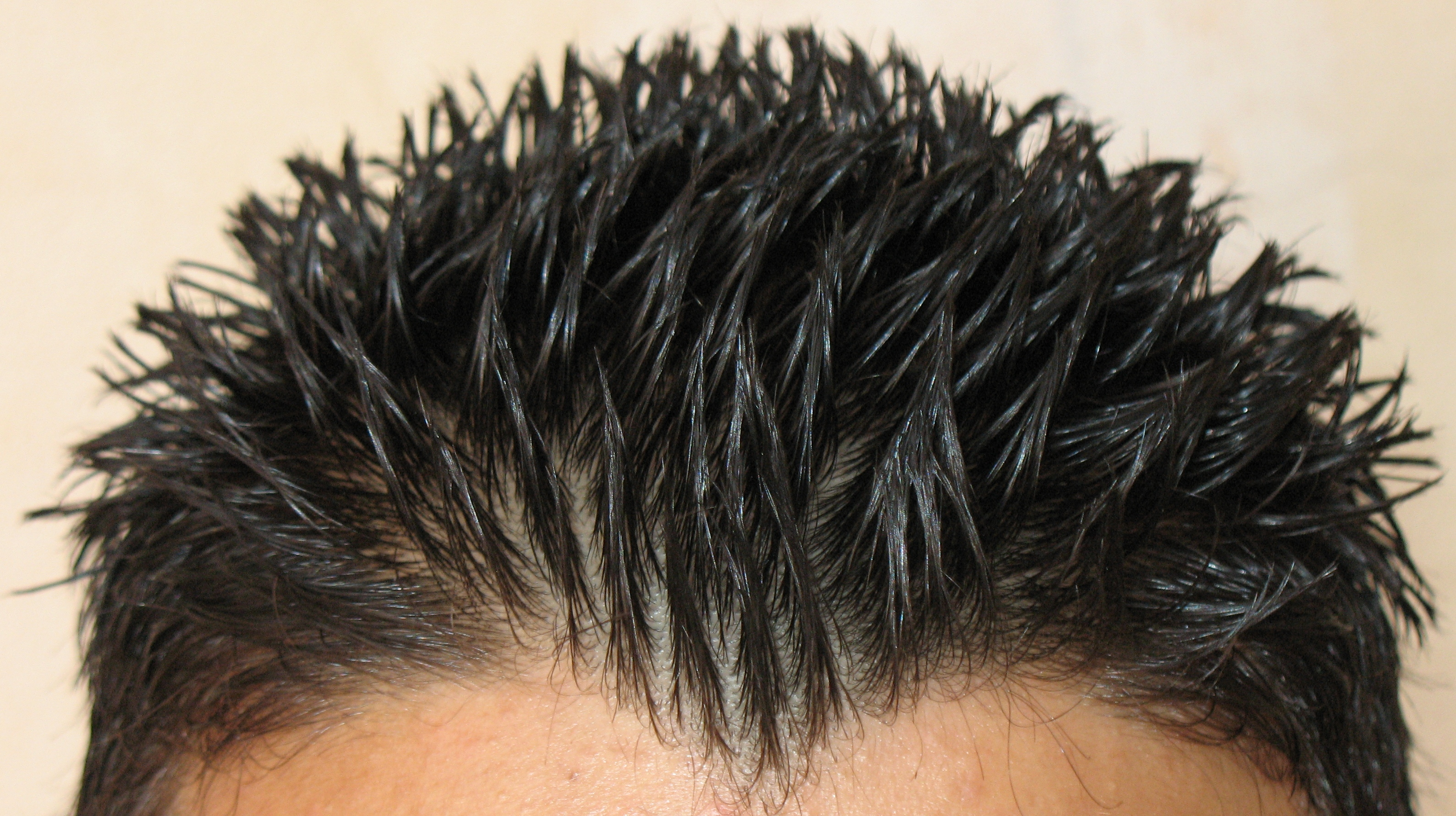
Short hair styled with hair gel

Hair gel is a hairstyling product that is used to harden hair into a particular hairstyle.

== History ==
Analysis of ancient Egyptian mummies has shown that they styled their hair using a fat-based gel. The researchers behind the analysis say that the Egyptians used the product to ensure that their style stayed in place in both life and death. Natalie McCreesh, an archaeological scientist from the KNH Centre for Biomedical Egyptology at the University of Manchester, England, and her colleagues studied hair samples taken from 18 mummies. The oldest is approximately 3,500 years old, but most were excavated from a cemetery in the Dakhleh Oasis in the Western Desert and date from Greco-Roman times, around 2,300 years ago.

The Irish bog body Clonycavan Man, which has been radiocarbon dated to between 392 BC and 201 BC, was found to have been using a hair gel made from pine tree resin imported from Spain or South-west France.

In 1914, in a small pharmacy located in the heart of Buenos Aires, Argentina (Florida at 600), veterinary student José Antonio Brancato mixed a fixative for hair which would carry the name "gomina" as a registered trademark. For this, he mixed gum Arabic, Persian tragacanth and different essences. Soon the word "gomina" became synonymous with fixative. A fixative that displaced the soaps and oils used for this purpose.

In 1929, the British company Chemico Works invented Brylcreem, which became the market leader among hair styling products in both the U.K. and the U.S. during the following decades.

In the 1960s, modern hair gel was invented in the United States, by what would later be renamed the Dep Corporation. Marketed under the brand name Dep, modern hair gel was given this name by its inventor, Luis Montoya, in recognition of the substance that gave it its unique, non-greasy consistency: diethyl phthalate, commonly abbreviated as DEP.

== Types ==
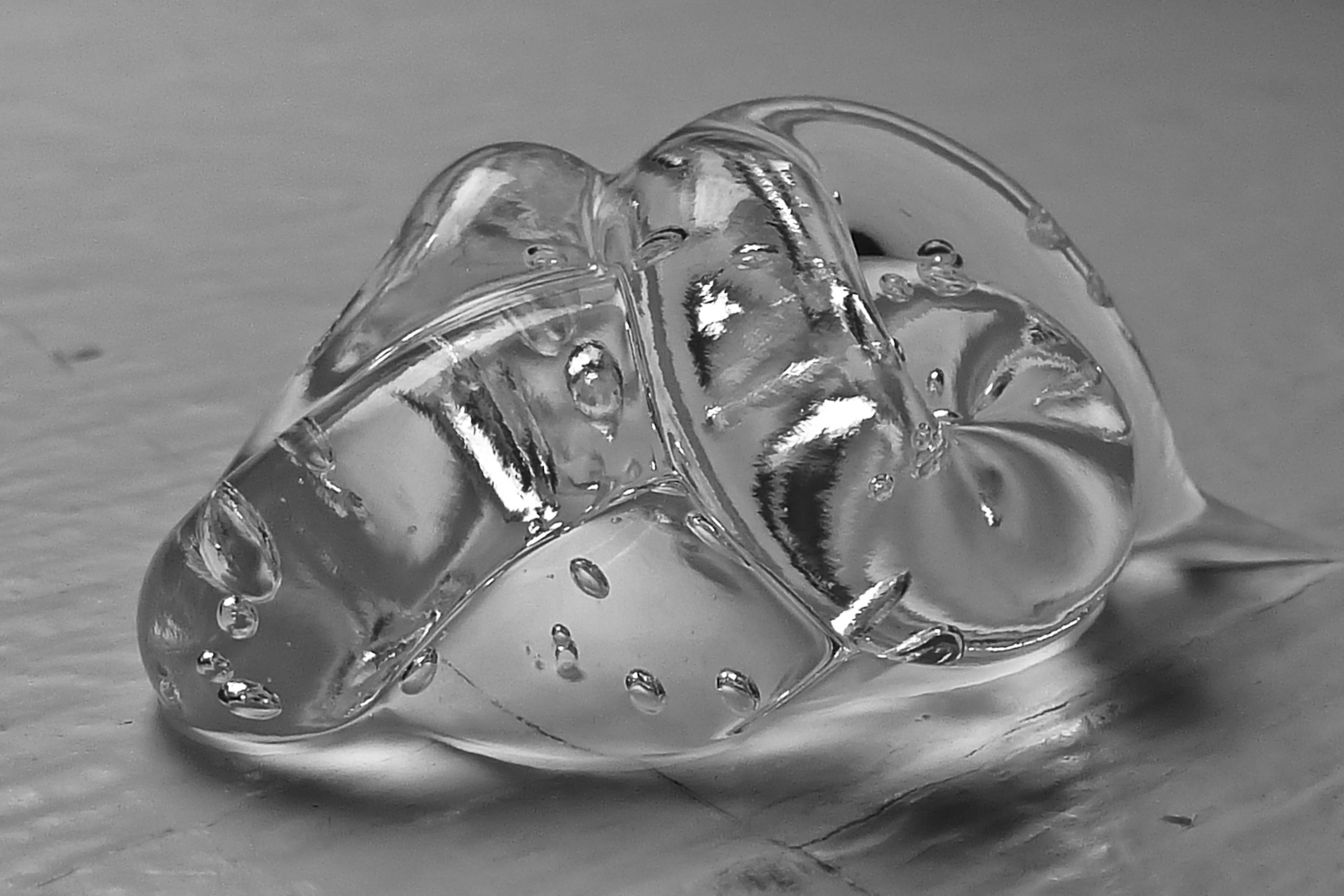
A dollop of hair gel.

Many brands of hair gel in North America and the UK come in numbered variants. Higher numbered gels maintain a greater "hold" on hair, while lower numbers do not make the hair as stiff and in some products give the hair a wet look. One category of hair gels is designed and manufactured specifically for sculpting the hair texture common to people of African descent. Other ethnic groups who are known for using hair gel include Mediterraneans, Eastern Europeans, Arabs and Latin Americans.

Some forms of hair gel are marketed to consumers who want to "spike" their hair in the style that emerged from the hardcore punk subculture in the 1980s. Some hair gels include temporary hair coloring, which includes variants in unnatural colors associated with various subcultures, such as the goths, ravers, mobsters, and greasers.

=== Cationic polymers ===
Cationic polymers are among the main functional components of hair gel. The positive charges in the polymers causes them to stretch, making the gel more viscous. Hair gels resist natural protein conformations and allow hair to be styled and textured, because the stretched-out polymer takes up more space than a coiled polymer and thus resists the flow of solvent molecules around it. The positive charges also bind the gel to the negatively charged amino acids on the surface of the keratin molecules in the hair.

== See also ==
- Hair mousse
- Hair wax
- Pomade
- Hair texture powder
- Bear's grease
- List of hairstyles
