= Édouard Pinaud =

- Born: 29 December 1810; Abbeville, French Empire
- Died: 2 October 1868 (aged 57)
- Other names: Ed. Pinaud
- Known for: Perfumes, Cosmetics, Watches, Joailleries and Aromatherapy
- Website: www.clubman.com

Édouard Pinaud (29 December 1810 – 2 October 1868) was a French businessman who founded the Ed. Pinaud perfume house and cosmetics company in 1830.

Leaving home at age 13 for Cologne, Pinaud sought to become an apprentice in perfumery. In 1830, he bought “A la Corbeille Fleurie”, a store located at 230 rue Saint Martin in Paris. In 1852, he partnered with his friend, Emile Meyer, to found La Villette (a perfume factory) and opened four stores in the city. On 18 August 1855, Queen Victoria went to Paris to attend the Universal Exposition that year. Pinaud wanted to attract her attention, and as such, created a perfume named after her: “Bouquet de la Reine Victoria”. As a result of this, Pinaud would become the official supplier to Queen Victoria, as well as Emperor Napoleon III.

Following Pinaud's death in 1868, Meyer took over management of the company, and in 1883 the company was handed to Meyer's son-in-law, Victor Klotz. Klotz would maintain control of the company until the Great Depression in the early 1930s.

The company today manufactures men's grooming products under the Clubman-Pinaud brand.
