= Hair spray =

Hair styling product

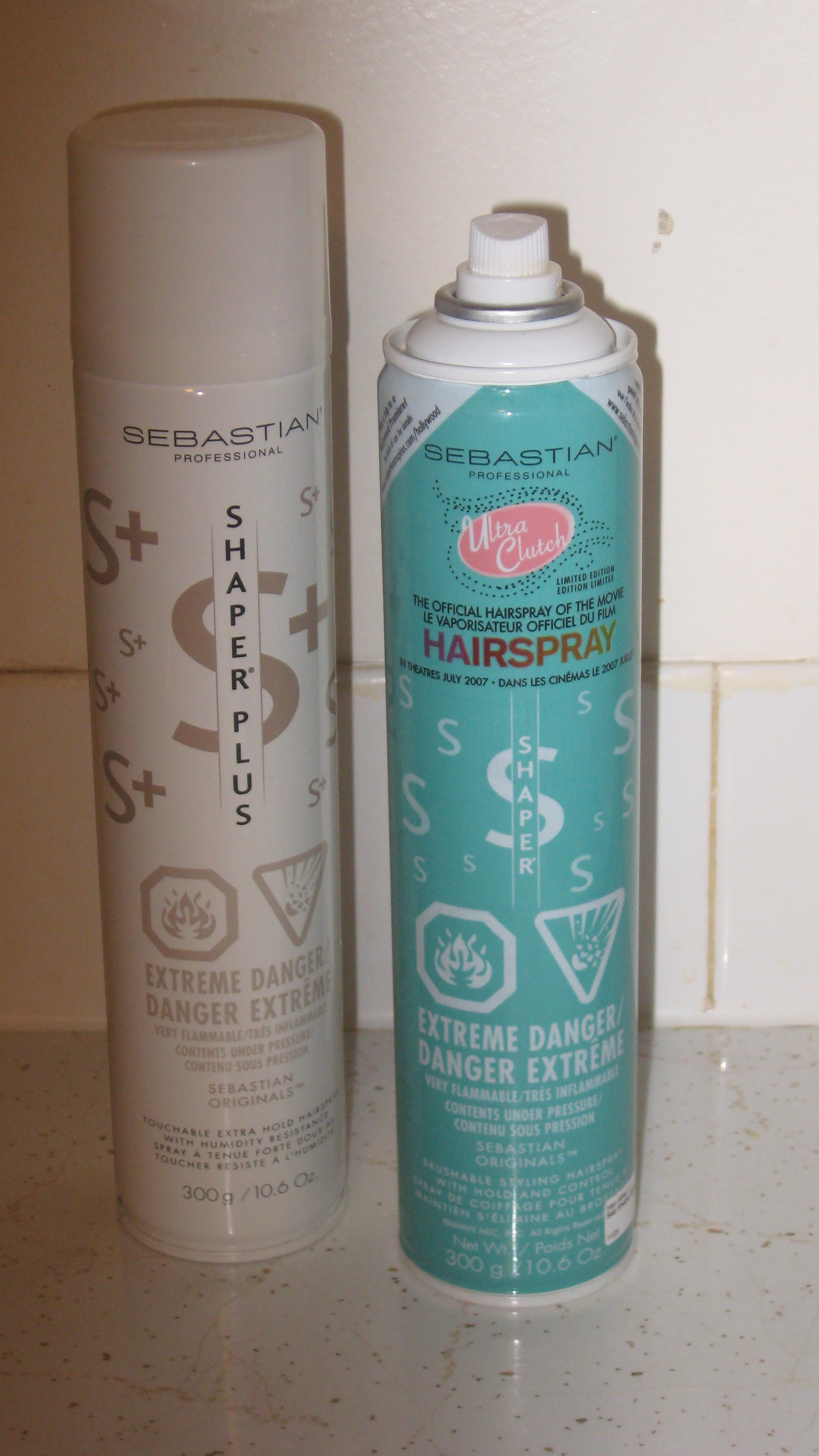
Two varieties of modern hair sprays.

Hair spray (also hair lacquer or spritz) is a common cosmetic hairstyling product that is sprayed onto hair to protect against humidity and wind and have it stay in a desired shape. Hair sprays typically consist of several components for the hair as well as a propellant.

== Ingredients and operation ==
Polyvinylpyrrolidone is a common component of hair spray that confers stiffness to hair.

Hair sprays consist of the following components: concentrate, plasticizers, luster agents, and fragrances, as well as propellants.

=== Concentrate ===
Hair spray are a blend of polymers that provide structural support to hair. These frequently include copolymers of polyvinylpyrrolidone (PVP) and polyvinyl acetate (PVAc). Vinyl acetate-crotonic acid copolymers give harder films. In this way hairsprays can be formulated as flexible, medium, and maximum hold. The copolymer mixture is usually adjusted to achieve the desired physical properties (adhesive strength, foaming, etc.), using plasticizers such as aminomethyl propanol, surfactants such as benzalkonium chloride, and other agents like dimethicone.

=== Propellants ===
Since the phase-out of CFCs in the 1980s, hydrocarbons are popular propellants. These include propane, butane, isobutane, and related volatile hydrocarbons, as well as other mixtures. Such hydrocarbons are poor solvents for the active ingredients such as the polymers. For this reason dimethyl ether is often added as well. It functions both as a propellant and a solvent. In addition to hydrocarbon propellants, fluorinated gases have been widely used as propellants to replace CFCs, with the most common gas being 1,1-difluoroethane. It is often listed as hydrofluorocarbon-152a.

=== Other components ===
Plasticizers used in hair spray include esters of citric acid and adipic acid. Silicones and polyglycols are also used.

The concentrate comprises only a small volume of a can of hairspray. Most of a canister is filled solvents such as isopropanol (rubbing alcohol) and ethanol.

== History ==
Early hair sprays were developed in Europe in the 1920s. In the United States, hair sprays were developed around the time of the aerosol can in the 1940s, and the first patents describing copolymers for hair styling were published in the 1940s.

In the US, the first to package it was Chase Products (an aerosol manufacturer) in 1948, as the beauty industry saw that the aerosol cans used in World War II for insecticides could be used as a dispenser for hairspray. It thrived and became increasingly popular and mass-produced, as updos and other such hairstyles were created. By 1964, it became the highest selling beauty product on the market.

In 1968 at the feminist Miss America protest, protestors symbolically threw a number of feminine products into a "Freedom Trash Can." These included hairspray, which was among the items the protestors called "instruments of female torture" and accoutrements of what they perceived to be enforced femininity.

Sales of hairspray declined in the 1970s as hairstyles became predominantly worn straight and loose. By the 1980s, hairsprays had seen a resurgence in popularity as big hairstyles resurged with the glam metal scene.

Prior to 1979, the most popular propellants in hairsprays were CFCs. Owing to environmental concerns, they were replaced.

Hair spray can have other uses: in the beauty world some might be applied to the leg and the inside of the dress so the dress would stay in place.

== See also ==
- Aerosol spray
- Copolymer
- Microbacterium hatanonis, an extremophile bacterium found to live in hairspray

== General and cited references ==
- Selinger, Ben (1994). Chemistry in the Marketplace, fourth ed. Sydney, Australia: Harcourt Brace. OCLC 32145668.
- Sherrow, Victoria (2006). "Hairspray". Encyclopedia of Hair: A Cultural History. Westport, CT: Greenwood. pp. 183-84.
