= Pompadour (hairstyle) =

Hairstyle

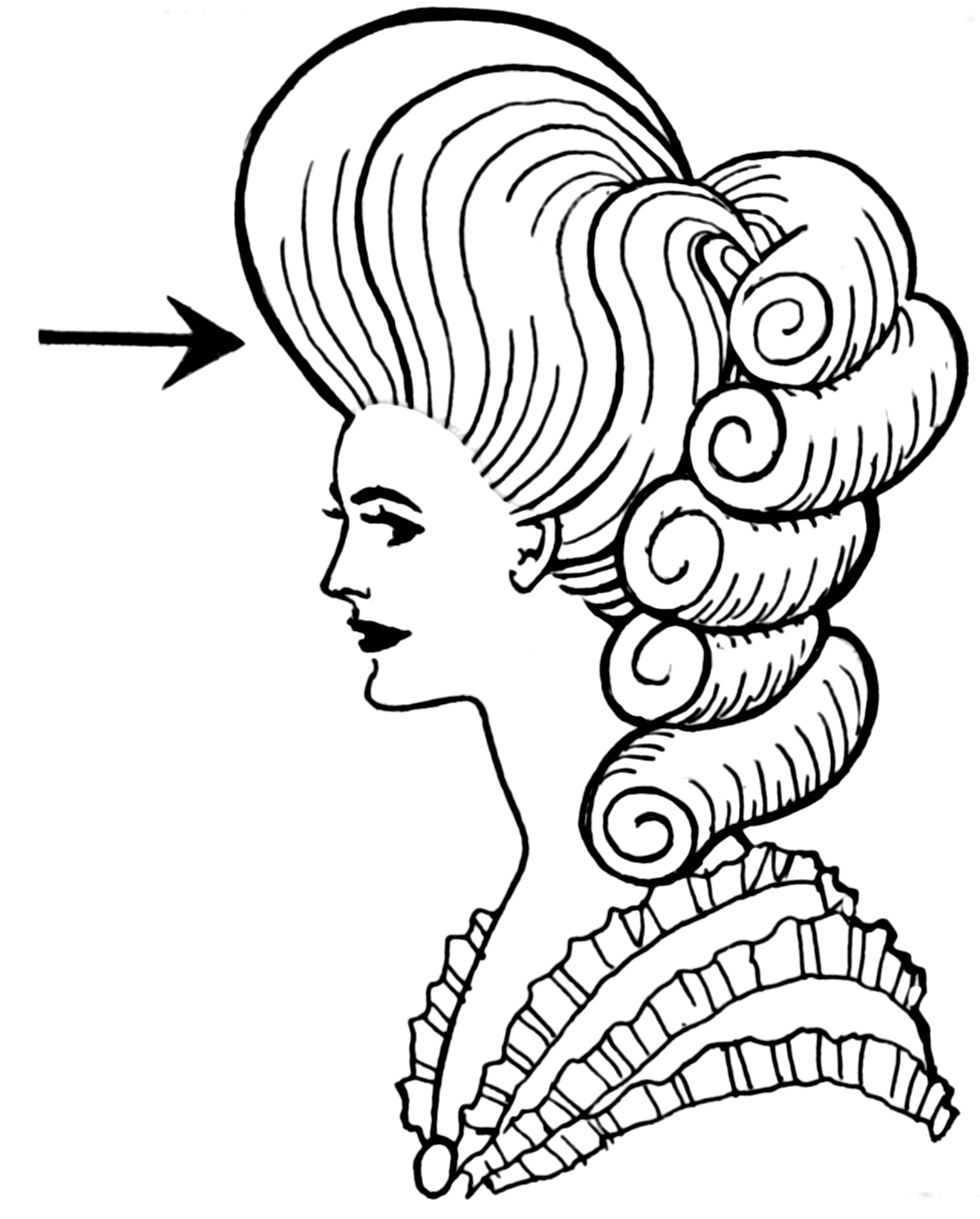
The primary feature of the pompadour hairstyle is a large volume of hair swept upwards from the forehead

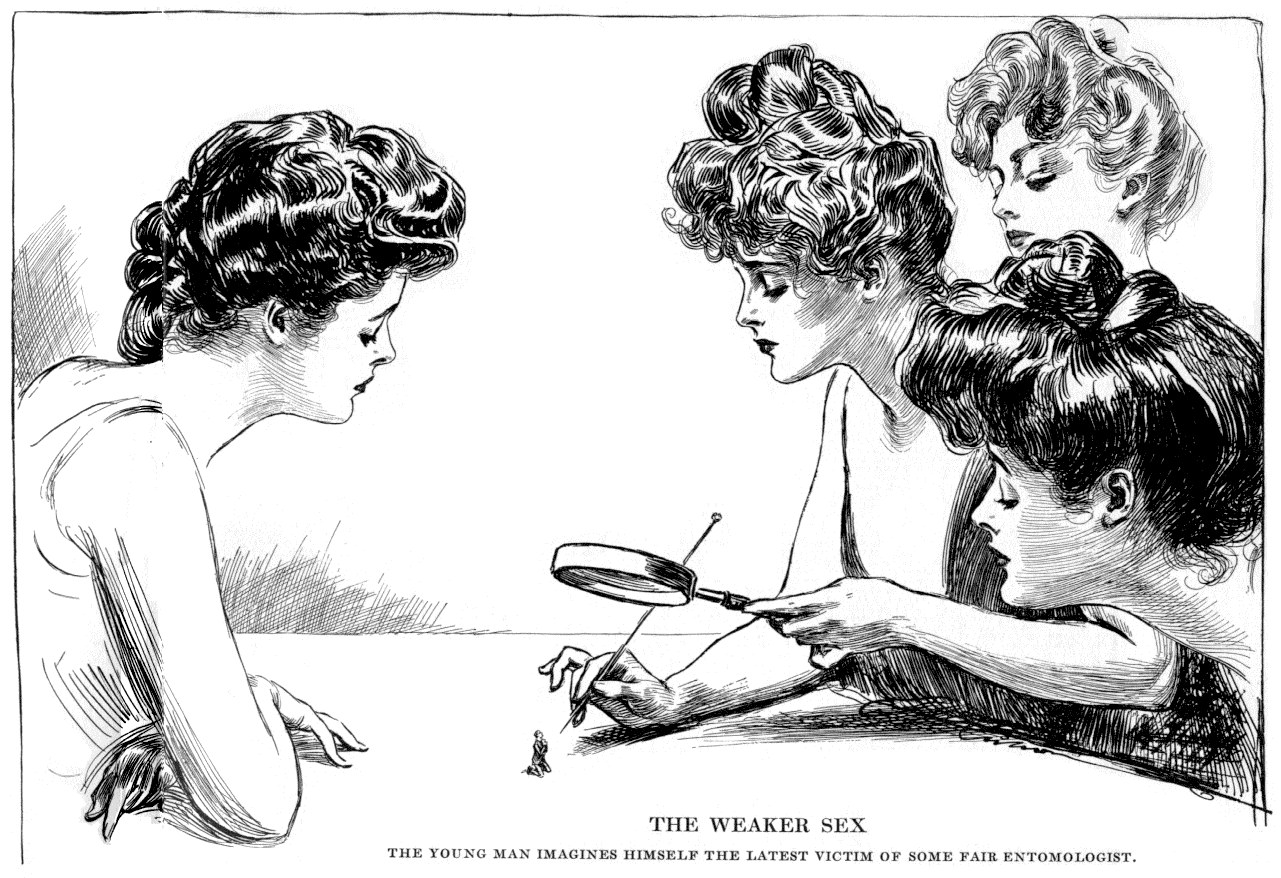
Hair in this style was an essential part of the "Gibson Girl" look in the 1890s

The pompadour is a hairstyle named after Madame de Pompadour (1721–1764), a mistress of King Louis XV of France. There are numerous variations of the style for men, women, and children. The basic concept is having a large volume of hair swept upwards from the face and worn high over the forehead, and sometimes upswept around the sides and back as well.

Despite the name, this hairstyle has nothing in common with the hairstyle of Madame de Pompadour, who wore her hair back rather than up, with no extra volume on the top. The name was coined in the 20th century.

== History ==
Adding vertical volume on top of the head, by combing the hair back and up above the forehead, is a trend that originated in women's hairstyles of the royal court in France, first in the 1680s, and again in the second half of the 18th century, long before and after Madame de Pompadour. In 1680, King Louis XIV loved the way his mistress the Duchess of Fontanges arranged her hair after she fell from her horse. She started wearing it like this every day to please him, and created a new hairstyle called the "Fontange", adding vertical volume to the hair. This fashion lasted for 20 years.

Under Louis XV, Madame de Pompadour's time, hair was worn rather low and backswept, with a simple aura of locks, and was never called a pompadour. A new, extravagant style adding again height and volume came into fashion under Louis XVI, around the 1770s and 1780s, culminating before the Revolution with the contemporaries of Marie-Antoinette. Stylists had daring ideas for adding more and more height.

The style was revived again in the 1890s as part of the Gibson Girl look and continued to be in vogue until World War I. In the 1925 novel The Great Gatsby, a character refers to Jay Gatsby having had a pompadour in his youth. The style was in vogue for women once again in the 1940s. The men's version appeared in the 1950s and early 1960s, worn by early country, rock and roll, and movie stars such as Elvis Presley, Johnny Cash, Chuck Berry, Ritchie Valens, James Dean, and Tony Curtis, and enjoyed a renaissance in the mid 2000s. The style has been worn by men and women in the 21st century.

== Women's styles ==
Variations of the pompadour style were popular for women in the late 18th century and again from the 1890s until World War I, and in the 1940s. The pompadour was often supported by a roll of false hair, over which the woman's own hair was combed up and back.

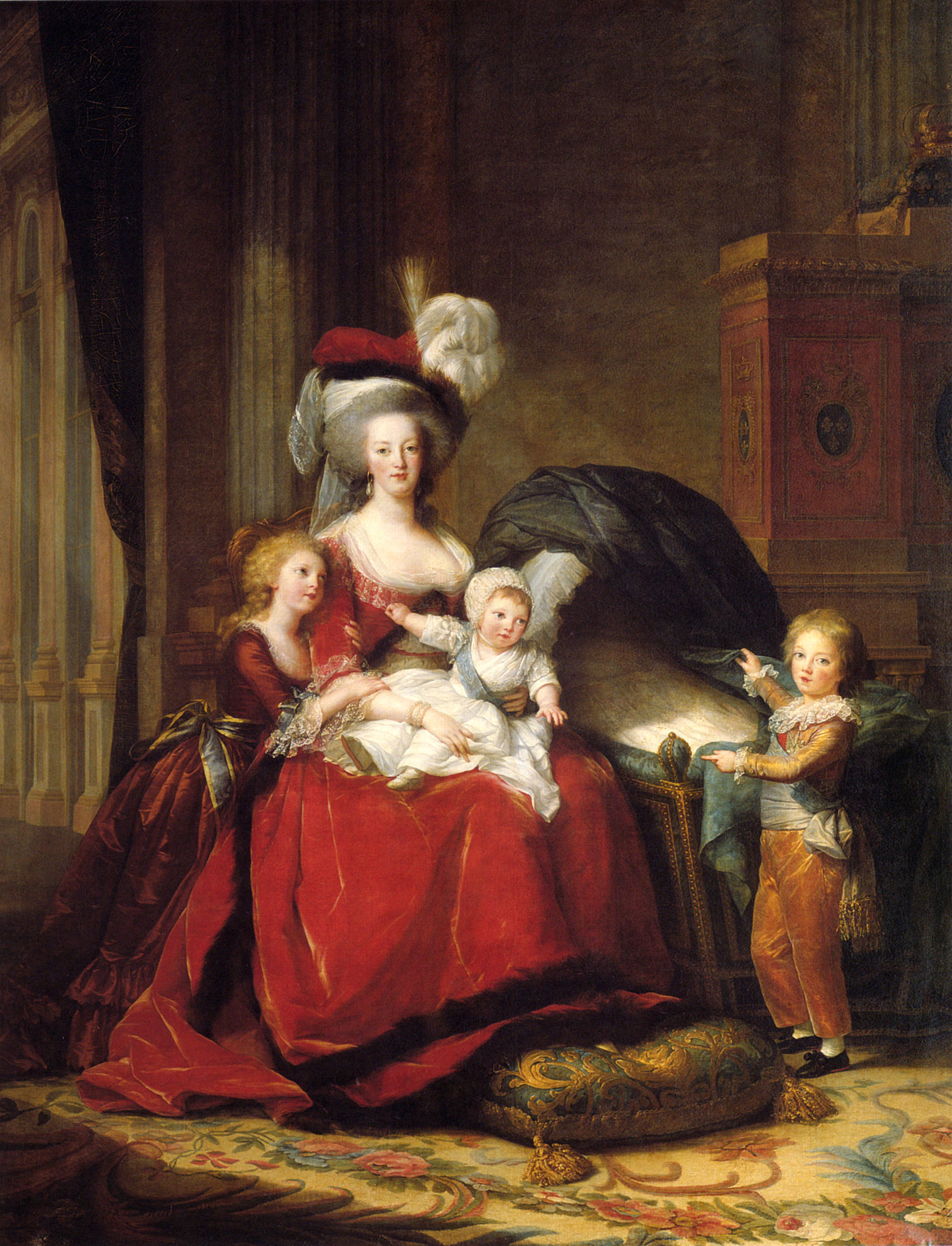
Queen Marie Antoinette wearing a large pompadour under an elaborate headdress, 1787

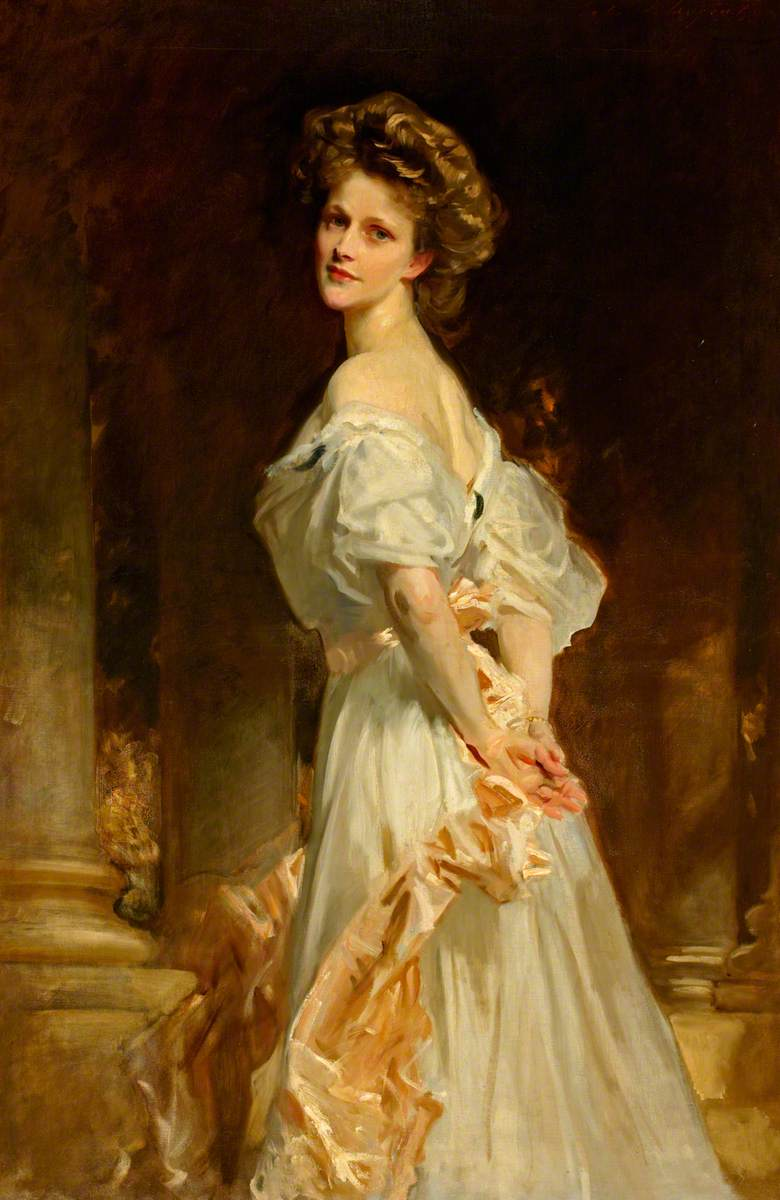
Lady Astor wearing hair in this style in a famous portrait by John Singer Sargent, 1909

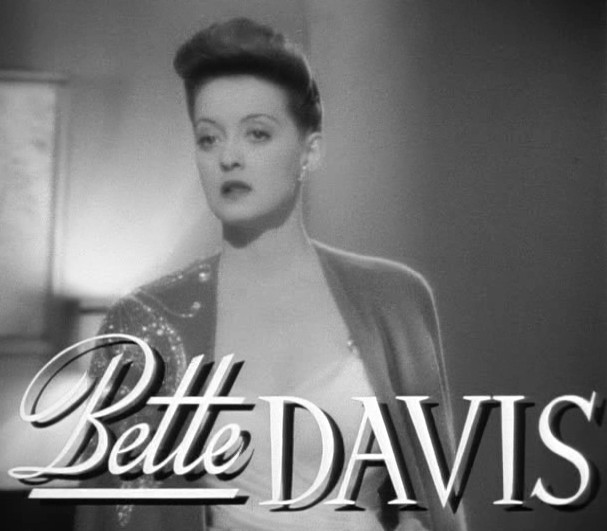
Bette Davis wearing an updated, streamlined pompadour in the film Now, Voyager, 1942

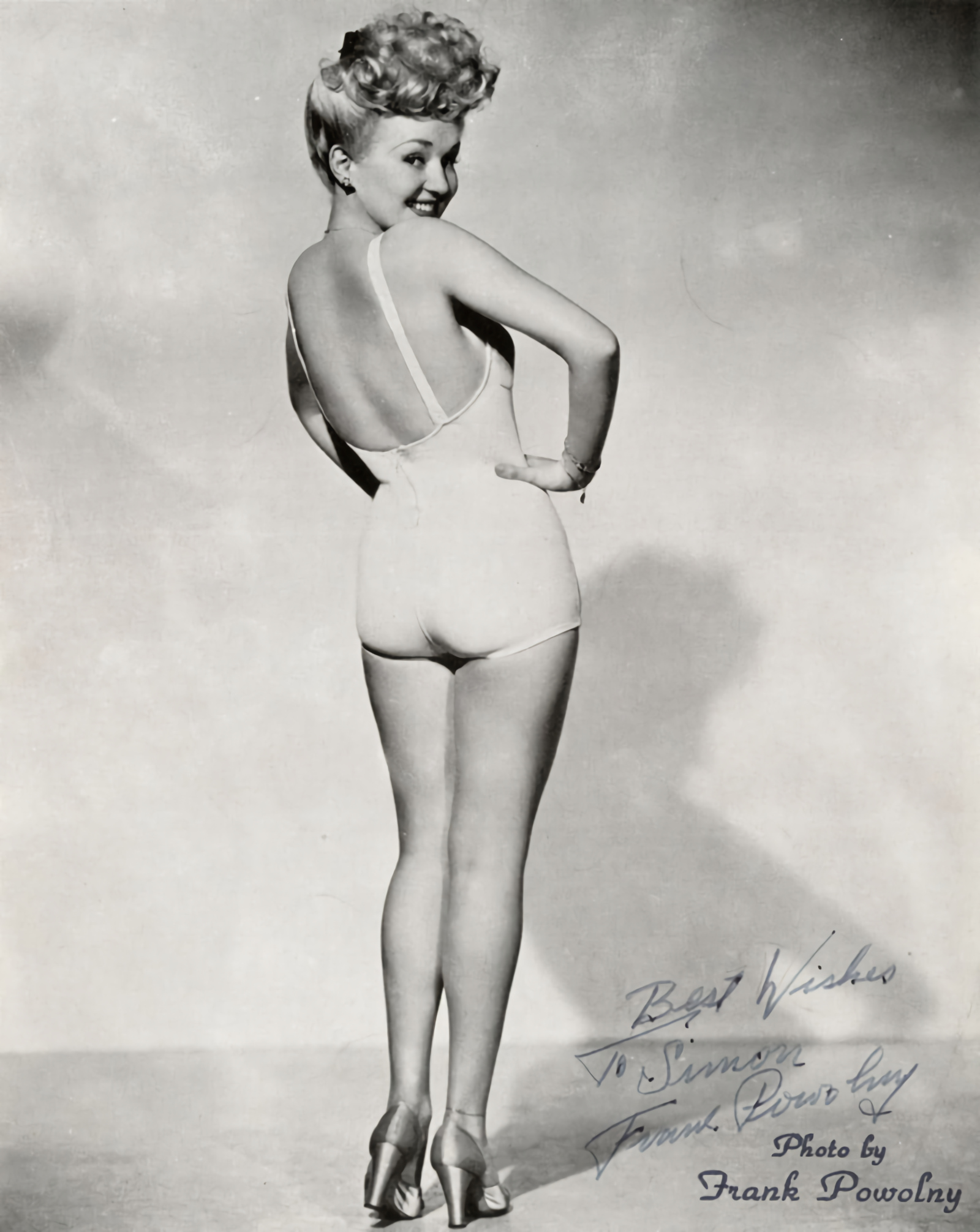
Actress and World War II pin-up girl Betty Grable wearing another variant of the pompadour style, 1943

Among women, the hairstyle became marginally popular again in the first few years of the 21st century. It can be created by backcombing or ratting at the roots of the hair on the sides of the pompadour towards the top of the head. Then the hair is combed up and over the ratted hair, off the forehead, the front up in a curl straight back, and the sides pulled back towards the center.

== Men's styles ==
Popular music and film stars had a major influence on 1950s hairstyles. Elvis Presley and James Dean had a great influence on the high quiff-pompadour greased-up style or slicked-back style for men with heavy use of Brylcreem or pomade. The pompadour was a fashion trend in the 1950s, especially among male rockabilly artists and actors. A variation of this was the duck's ass (or in the UK "duck's arse"), also called the "duck's tail", the "ducktail", or simply the D.A.

During the 1980s, the hair style was associated with the "rockabilly" culture, and adopted by those enamoured with vintage culture of the late 1950s and early 1960s, which included antique cars, hot rods, muscle cars, American folk music, greasers, Teddy Boys, rockabilly bands, and Elvis Presley impersonators.

Celebrities known for wearing pompadours during the 1950s and 1960s include Little Richard as well as actors such as James Dean, Marlon Brando, and Desi Arnaz.

There are Latin variants of the hairstyle across Latin America, with some European influence. In the United States, from the 1930s to the 1960s, the pompadour and ducktail were popular among many Latinos, such as Mexican American Chicanos, Cuban Americans and Puerto Ricans.

Although the pompadour was popular across all ethnic and racial groups in the mid-20th century, it's maintained popularity among Italian Americans and the "goombah" or "Guido" subculture. The style is often utilized in shows like The Sopranos or Jersey Shore. Notable gangsters, such as John Gotti, have sported the hair style.

In modern Japanese popular culture, the pompadour is a stereotypical hairstyle often worn by gang members, thugs, members of the yakuza, the bōsōzoku, and other similar groups such as the yankii (high-school hoodlums). In Japan the style is known as the "Regent" hairstyle, and is often caricatured in various forms of entertainment media such as anime, manga, television, and music videos, often into improbable levels of length and volume. The punch perm combines elements of the afro hairstyle and the traditional pompadour. This style, too, is stereotypically worn by less reputable members of society, including the yakuza, bōsōzoku, and chinpira (street thugs). For Josuke Higashikata from Diamond Is Unbreakable, Ryunosuke “Rio” Umemiya from Shaman King, and Gunkan from Bobobo-bo Bo-bobo, the hairstyle became a signature detail.

In the psychobilly subculture, the pompadour is slightly modified to form the quiff. The quiff is a hairstyle worn by Psychobilly fans and musicians (Kim Nekroman frontman of Nekromantix for example). A psychobilly wedge is a sort of mix between a mohawk hairstyle and the pompadour, where the hair along the side of the head is shaved and the middle is not spiked but slicked back and stood up like a pompadour.

Since 2011, the modern pompadour has been a trend. The pompadour hairstyle was seen on celebrities such as Conan O'Brien.

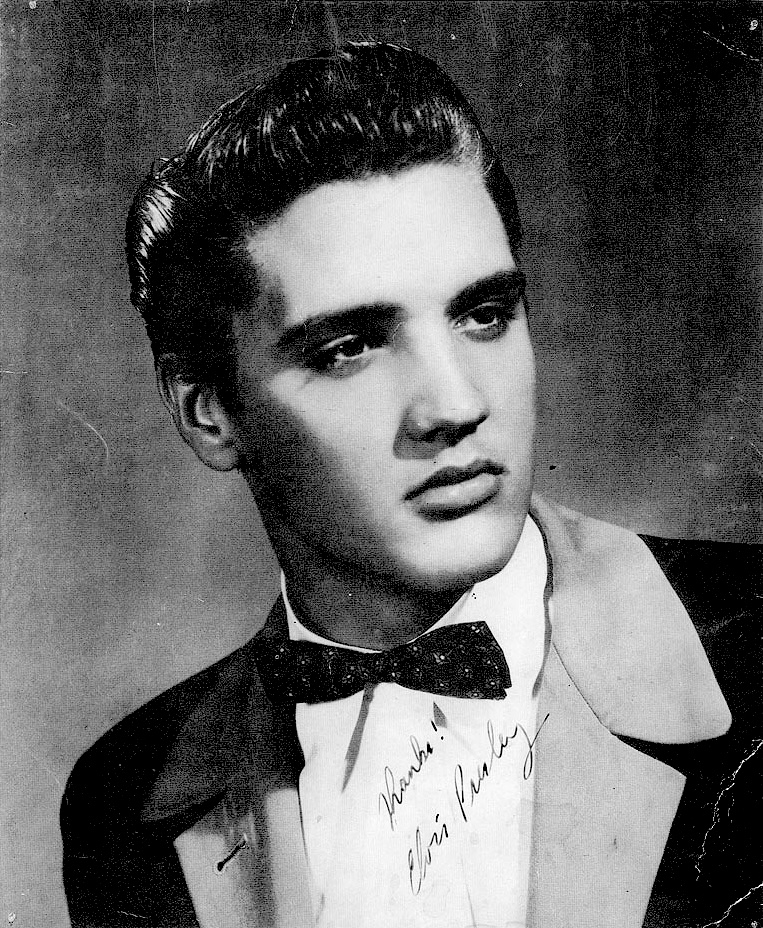
Elvis Presley with a pompadour haircut in 1954

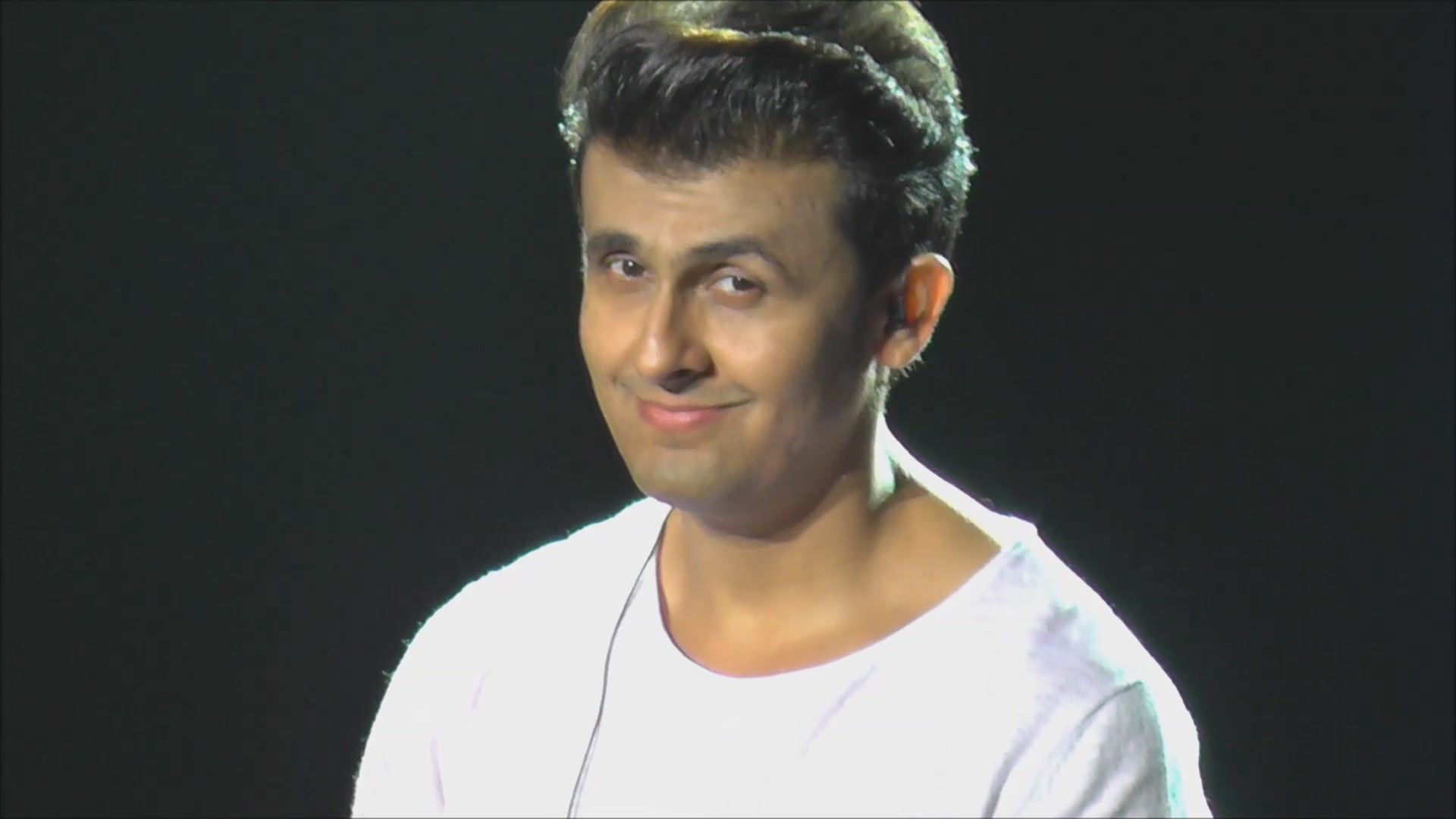
Indian pop star Sonu Nigam with modern adaptation of the Teddy Boy cut

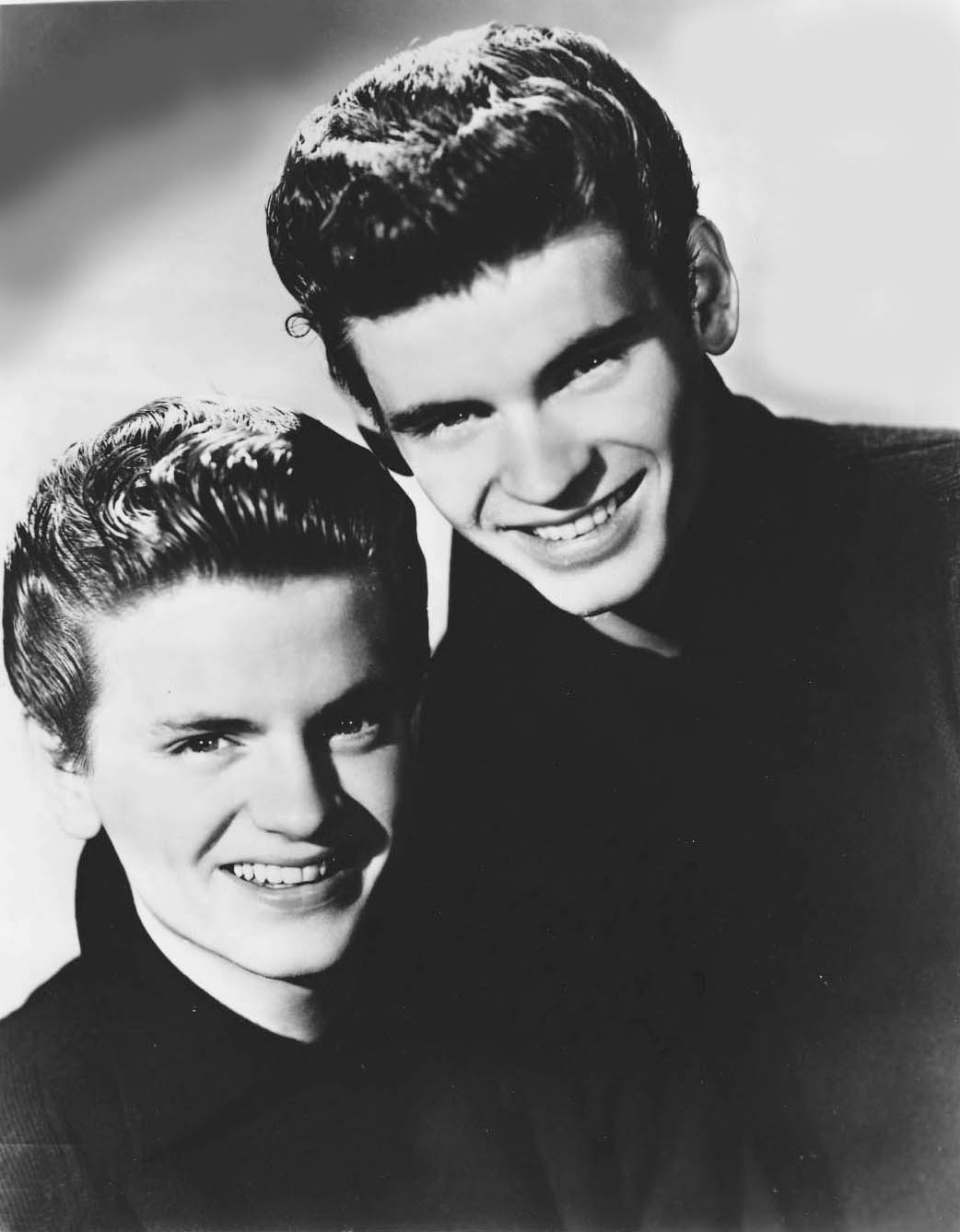
Everly Brothers' pompadour haircuts

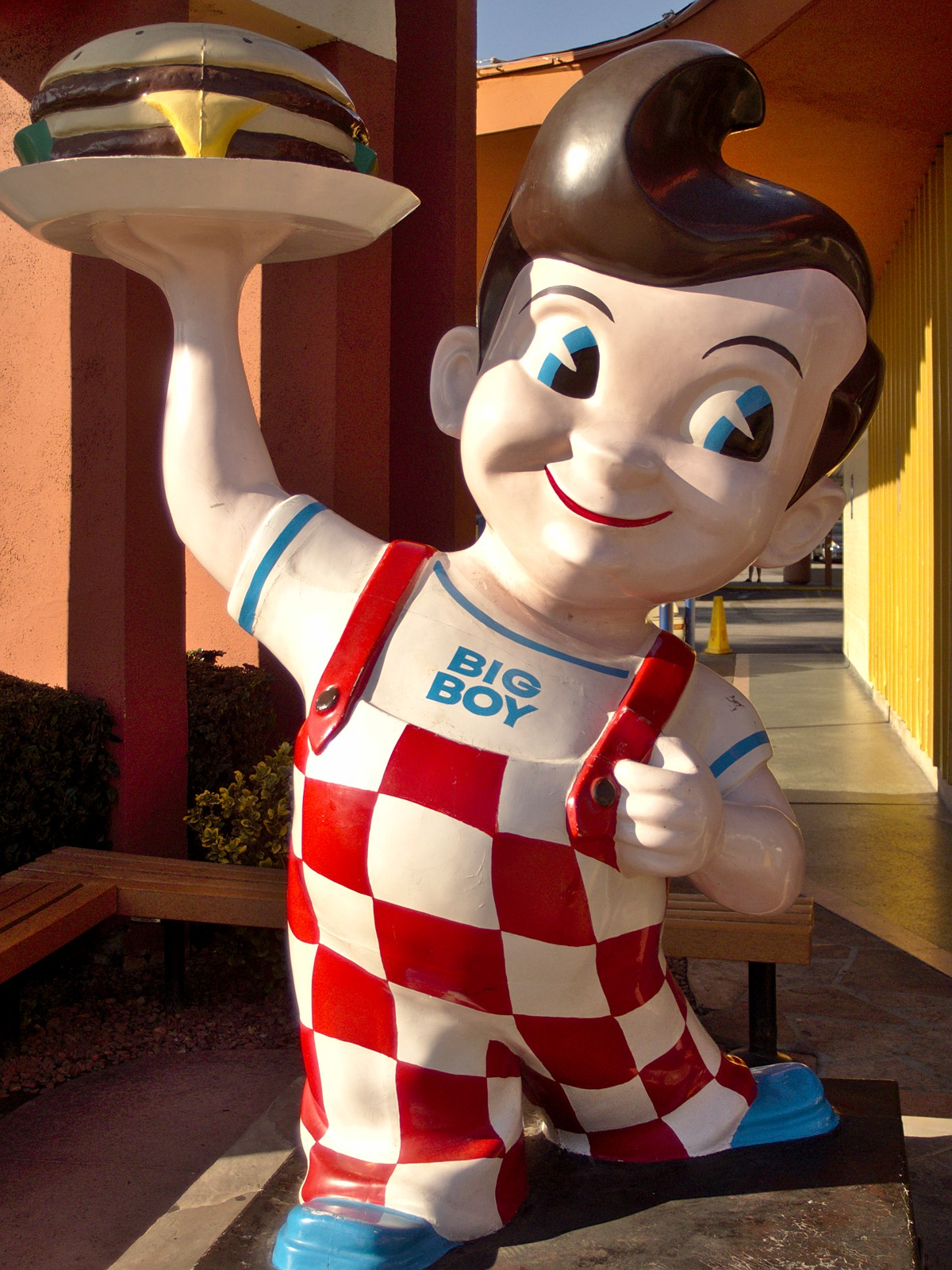
Big Boy Restaurants statue

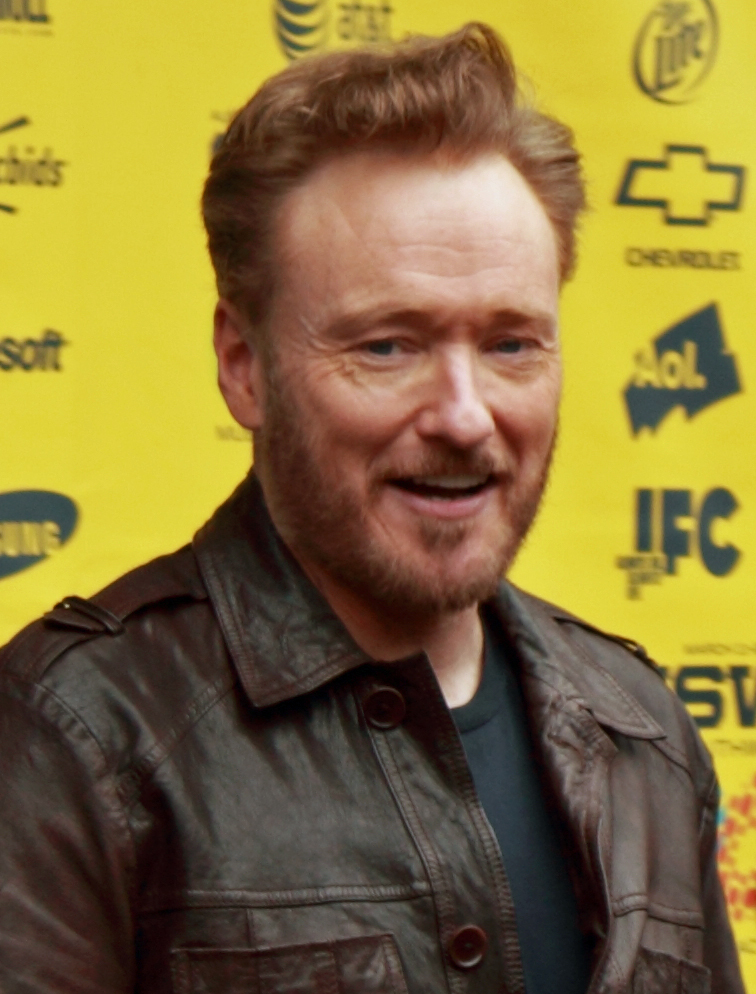
Conan O'Brien in 2011 cut

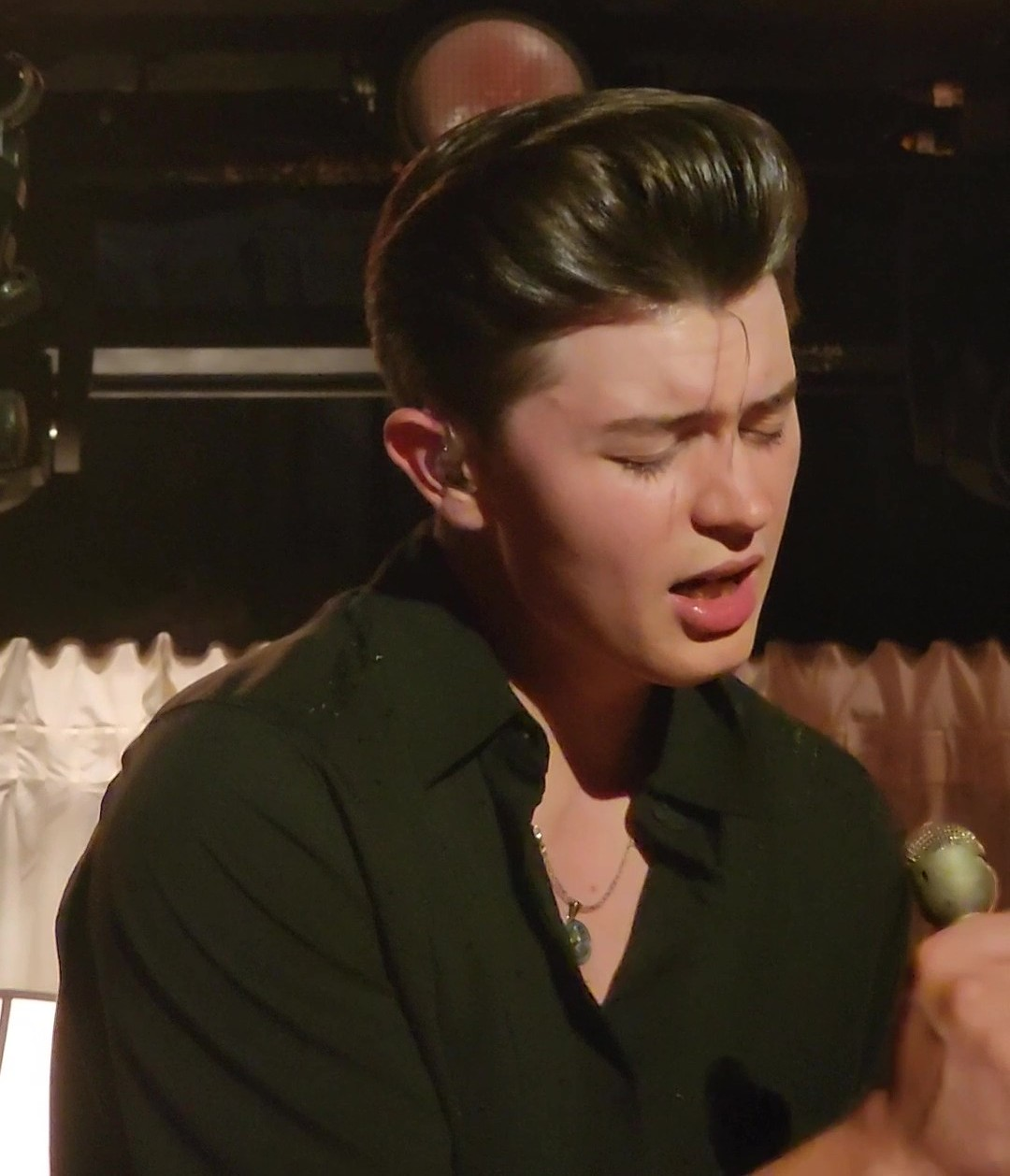
Elliot James Reay with a pompadour haircut in 2025

== See also ==
- Big hair
- Bouffant
- List of hairstyles
