= Dread perming =

Hair treatment method

Dread perming is a chemical treatment that is used both by beauty salons and do-it-yourselfers to create or maintain dreadlocks. The hair is exposed to chemicals that render the hair frizzy. The frizzy hair is bound together and treated again to form the dreadlocks. Dread perming is often used on straight hair, to give it more texture that can accelerate the locking process.

Dread perms usually cost in the range of $300–$400 at a salon, and although pricey, often prove to be the easiest and most professional way of creating dreadlocks. Another option is to buy a home-perm kit, as these will only cost $10–$20, with a similar, if not better result. The process can take upwards of six hours to complete, with maintenance appointments being around two hours long and pricey at upwards of $200 if done at a salon. The process works especially well on hair that is more difficult to dread, especially white people's hair or Asian hair. This method requires no use of waxes or palm rolling the hair. A regular six-month appointment is all the maintenance required, although tightening sprays are beneficial in the meantime.

The dread perming technique begins with at least six inches of hair. The hair is then separated into appropriately sized dreadlock sections. Each individual section is then backcombed, or teased, to knot the hair and create a dreadlock shape. Depending on the method used, the dreads will either be tightly back combed, or more loosely formed. The new dreadlocks are either permed in as is, twisted, or wrapped around curlers to achieve form.

Once the chemicals are applied to the hair, each strand of hair begins to swell. This swelling causes the hair to forget its original form. The hair then begins to shrink back to its normal size, permanently taking on the shape the hair is currently in.

Dreadlocks created with a dread perm can take on the shape of the method used to set them—curled if they were wrapped around curlers, twisted or kinky. The perm also serves to "rough up" Asian or white people's hair so that it will more easily tangle. A natural look begins to occur a few months later when the hair loosens somewhat. Within the timespan of several weeks to months, depending on the setting method, dread-permed dreadlocks will look nearly indistinguishable from naturally grown dreadlocks.

== See also ==
- Hairstyles
- Madam C.J. Walker
