= High roll =

Hairstyle

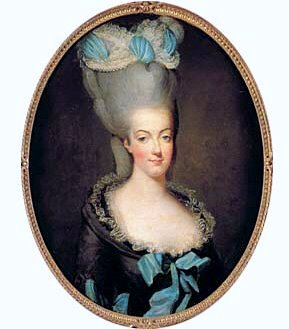
Marie Antoinette wearing a high roll.

A high roll is a hairstyle that Western women wore in the late 1700s. It was especially associated with France, England, and what later became the United States.

The hairstyle was considered a status symbol because it required the wearer to sit for hours while a professional hairdresser set the roll.

The hairstyle could be very tall and make the wearer's head seem twice as high. First, the woman's hair would be combed. Then the woman or her hairdresser would add pomatum to the hair so it could be shaped. The pomatum would have treated fat, oil and perfumes or spices in it. This would add a pleasant scent, kill headlice, and help hold the hair in place. Women would add extra hair collected from cows, horses, other people, or their own collected hair from their hairbrushes for extra volume. Women and hairdressers would place pillows or wire frames inside the hair to hold it up. The hair would be placed in curlers and left overnight. Some women would make curls along the sides or neck with curlers. The hair was held in place with pins. The hair could be natural color or colored gray, brown or white with powder. The hairstyle could be as high as 2 feet (0.61 meters).

The hairstyle produced some odor and many women complained of itching, which they soothed with ivory head-scratchers specially designed to leave the hairstyle undisturbed. The high roll was redone only every few weeks. Between hairdressing sessions, women would sleep with traps for headlice and mice on their heads.

Some women, for example, Queen Marie Antoinette of France, would wear feathers, jewelry, or sculptures of plants and animals in their high hair. Some women said that it would itch.

== History ==
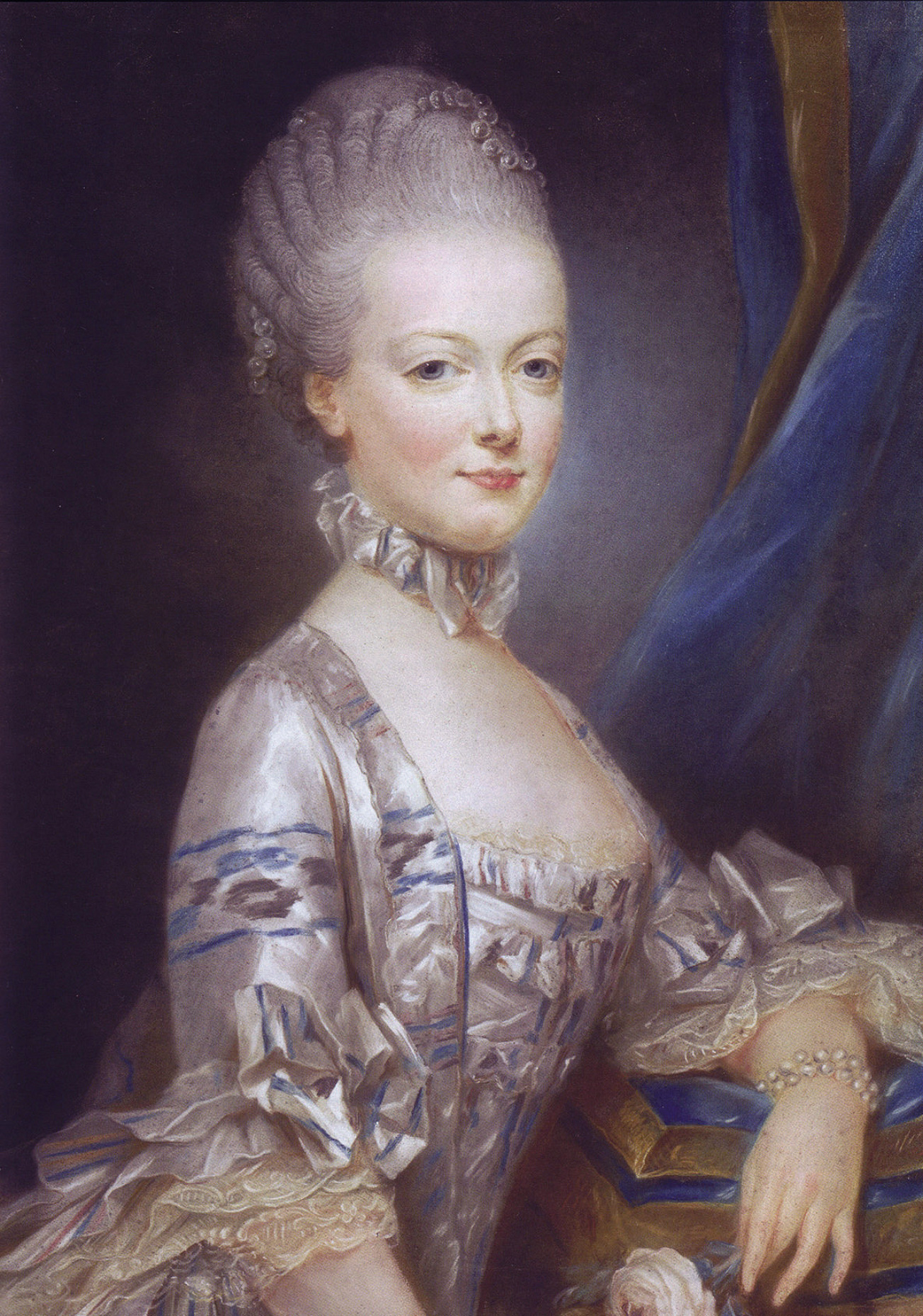
Marie Antoinette in 1769 wearing an early high roll.

In the beginning of the 1700s, the fashion for women's hair was relatively natural, with curls and caps. Over the course of the century, men's tendency to wear wigs and more complex styles spread to women. The earliest high rolls were observed in the late 1760s and became taller over time. They began in France and later appeared in London and North America. By the end of the 1700s, the fashion for more natural-looking hair on women returned.

== Criticism ==
English critics complained that English women had copied the style from France. American critics complained that women had copied it from England— this being in the 1770s, during the American Revolutionary War with England. During the war, many Americans favored economic and cultural independence from Britain as well as political. They would wear homespun clothes instead of imported cloth and preferred simpler adornments. During the war, the high roll came to be seen as associated with the pro-British Tory loyalists.

Other critics said the feathers in the hairstyles made women look like male soldiers with plumed helmets. American critics also complained that the hairstyle made white women look like African-American men. In the 1770s, African-American men wore their hair in a bunch over their foreheads. Rich men also worried about their wives and daughters spending time with male hairdressers.

One woman in New York described several women wearing high rolls as having "an acre and a half of shrubbery, besides grass-plots, tulip beds, kitchen gardens, peonies, etc."

There are many political cartoons making fun of the high roll and other high hairstyles.

== In popular culture ==
In the television show Turn, women in New York and Philadelphia wear and talk about high rolls.
