= Hair curler =

Hair curler may refer to:

- a hair roller
- a hair iron
