= Hair mousse =

Hairstyling product

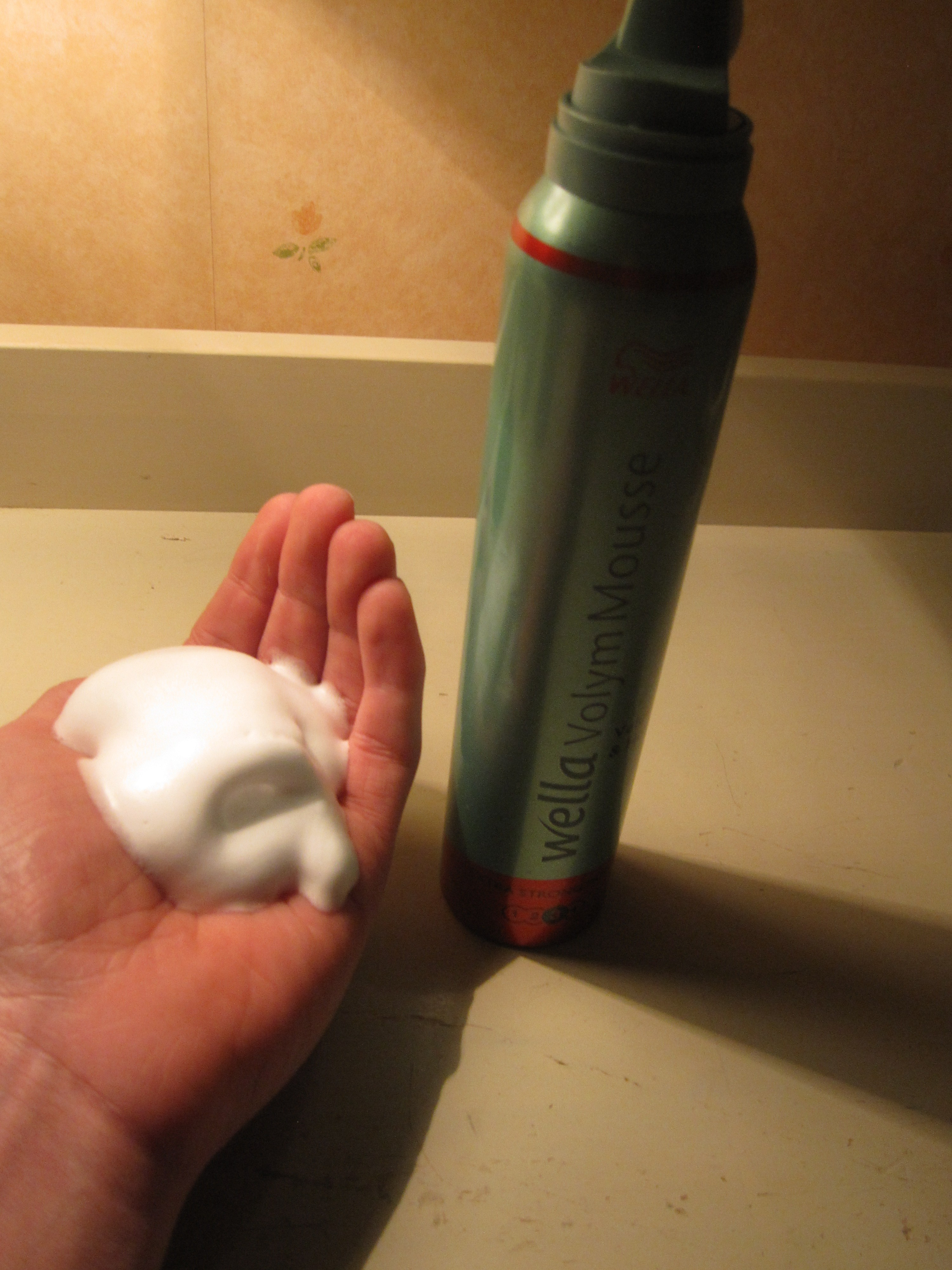
Hair mousse

Hair mousse, also referred to as styling foam, is a hairstyling product to protect, control, and style hair. "Mousse" originates from a French term meaning foam. Hair mousse originated in France and was taken to the North American retail market by L'Oreal in the 1980s.

It is often dispensed in an aerosol foam spray or in cream form. Hair mousse adds volume to hair and provides both conditioning and hold, without any clumps or build-up. It is a hairstyling product which works by using synthetic resins to coat the hairs, to assist the hair in taking a certain shape.

== History ==
The early 1980s arrival of hair mousse in North America was known as "mousse mania" as hairdressers unveiled the new foam product to their clientele. Throughout its first years on the market, hair mousse quickly became a multimillion-dollar product. 1984 domestic retail sales for the product ranged from $100–$150 million and almost $200 million in sales by 1986.

By the mid-1980s, the big hair style trend and the usage of mousse and other volumizing products increased in popularity. It is believed that the year 1987 marked the decline of "mousse mania", as the popularity of having big hair decreased and people began to grow concerned about using more environmentally friendly products. Due to the chemical makeup of the hairstyling product it was not commonly deemed "environmentally friendly".

== Application ==
As a versatile and light-weight hair styling product, hair mousse is a popular choice for both short and long hairstyles and can be used on naturally curly or permed hair to reduce frizz and define curl. When hair mousse is applied to wet hair that is dried with a hair dryer or diffuser attachment, it provides additional volume and hold.

Temporary color mousse can be used to cover up grey hair and create hair styles at the same time. Semi-permanent color mousse can be used to give toning to hair that is fading from hair color processes.

== Ingredients ==
Typically, the first ingredient in a canister of hair mousse is water, which is the top substance used to blend the varying chemical substances together. Alcohol helps dissolve the ingredients already added to the water and helps produce a quick breaking foam.

A polymer or resin is the most effective and important component of hair mousse, which acts as a conditioning agent. These resins are long chain molecules that form a film on the hair allowing a tighter grip on the hair strands, making it harder to brush off and form a resistant film. This allows users to comb or brush their hair, as well as apply heat from a blow dryer without the mousse leaving the hair stiff.

Cationic resin is often blended with another film former to give a firmer hold on the hair. In order for this to be successful, the polymer chosen must be nonionic in nature and should be compatible with the cationic resin. Emulsifiers are used to help blend the product creating foam. Mousses do not require long-lasting foam stability. Ideally, the foam will break down immediately once worked into the hair.

Other added ingredients in various hair mousses, such as vitamins, silicones, sunscreens, and dyes, tend to assist in additional functions for the hair mousse product, such as providing an additional conditioning component.

Certain brands contain alcohol, which is suitable for most hair types except dry.
