= Shampoo and set =

Hair styling treatment

A shampoo and set was a hair styling treatment that first became popular in the United Kingdom from the 1930s. The treatment involved washing the hair using shampoo, applying setting lotion to the hair and placing the hair on hair rollers, and then drying it to set the shape of the hair into the chosen style. The rollers would be held in place and protected by a hairnet, and a headscarf worn over it to protect the hairnet-and-rollers ensemble from the elements.

As of 2016 the shampoo and set has lost its former popularity in the UK, except with members of the older generation who have stuck with older hairstyles that require it.

== See also ==
- Permanent wave
- List of hairstyles
