= Big hair =

Bouffant hairstyle

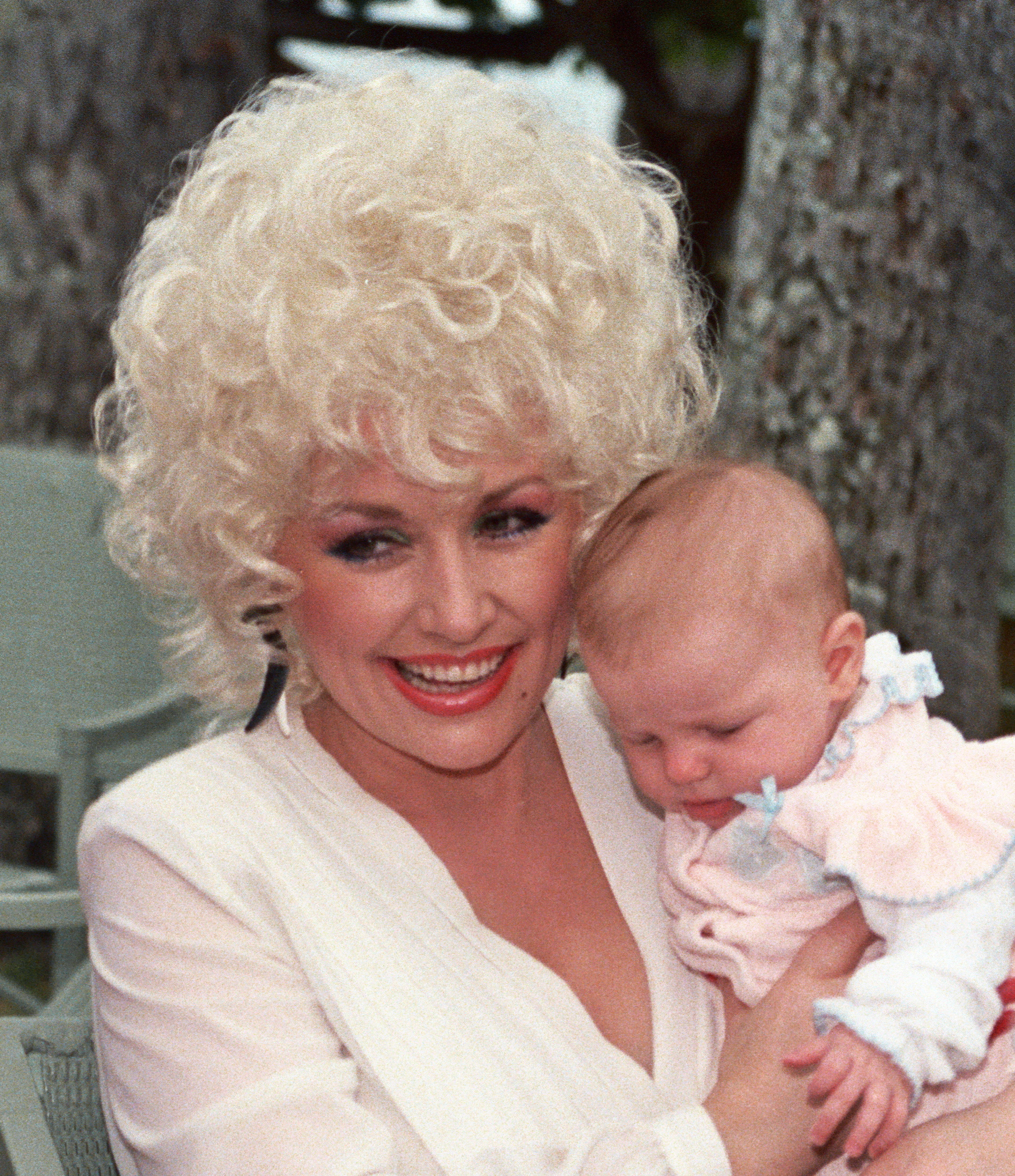
Dolly Parton in 1983

Big hair is a hairstyle that emphasizes large volume or largely styled hair, especially when those styles make the hair occupy a large amount of space above and around the head. The label "big hair" for such styles originated in the late 1970s, when these styles were beginning a period of popularity. Similar styles have become fashionable at various periods in history.

== History ==
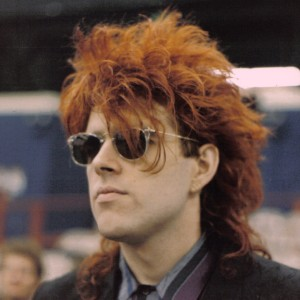
Tom Bailey of the Thompson Twins, 1986

Actresses like Raquel Welch, Brigitte Bardot, Priscilla Presley and Jane Fonda became big-haired icons throughout the 1960s and 1970s. Women's hairstyles labelled as "big hair" became fashionable during this period, with the Farrah Fawcett red swimsuit poster an iconic example. The fashion persisted with certain regional subcultures in the southern United States, and the styles are sometimes also associated with female country music performers. It is also associated with the exaggerated stereotypical femininity associated with drag queens and similar gender performers.

Big hair became popular in the 1980s for men as well as for women. The term is also used in the glam rock, hair metal, goth and alternative cultures and is particularly associated with fashion of the 1980s, or inspired by the period. From these origins, big hair became a feature of a number of Japanese street and alternative fashions, including Harajuku and ganguro. In the early 1980s, Brooke Shields became a dominant force in the fashion trend after becoming a teen model in 1980. She has appeared in numerous magazine covers with different styles of long and big hair, making her one of the most influential fashion icons of the early 1980s. In the mid-1980s, rising pop star Madonna sported big hair when photographed by Francesco Scavullo for Time. Many women subsequently emulated her look, making her one of the most iconic celebrities in 1980s fashion.

== Techniques ==
Depending on the specific style, hairstyles in the big hair categories may require a number of styling, cutting, or treatment techniques. Styling of punk and alternative big hair styles often requires backcombing (teasing) and the liberal application of styling aids such as hair spray, hair mousse, or hair gel, often in combination with the use of hair dryers. Crimping irons, perms, hair rollers, or other techniques may also be required.

== Naturally voluminous hair ==
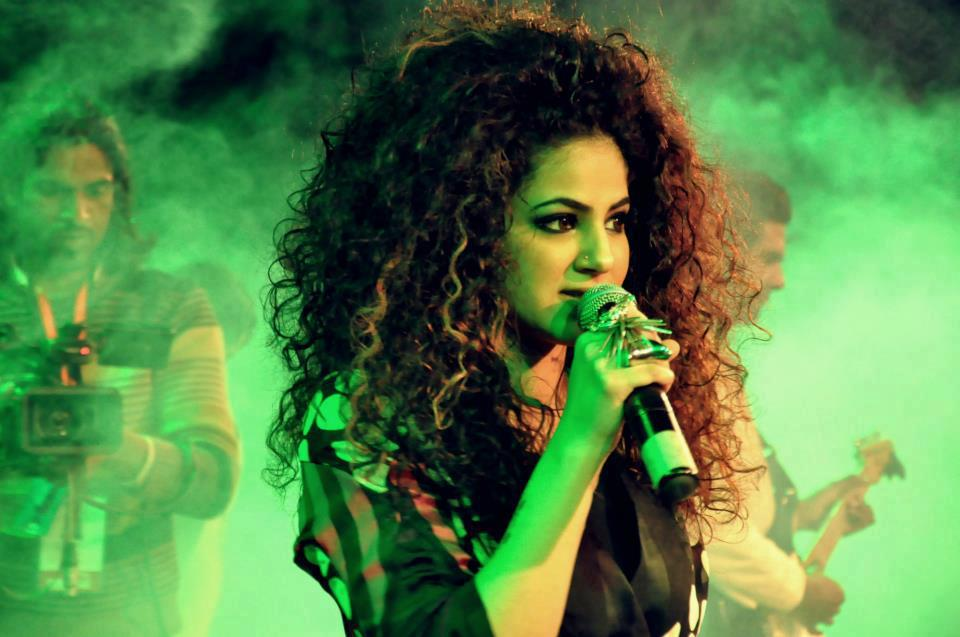
Singer Annie Khalid

Many people of various ethnicities throughout the world have naturally voluminous hair. For these people, "big hair" is not a deliberate fashion statement requiring any particular technique to achieve, but rather the default state of their hair. Some 60 percent of the world's population has naturally curly hair, which tends to be more voluminous than straight hair.

Big hair is seen as artificial or trendy by some people. This has often led to misunderstandings and even discrimination based on hair texture. In 2013, for example, 12-year-old Vanessa VanDyke was threatened with expulsion for wearing her hair in its natural state. School officials claimed her voluminous hair was a "distraction". In some East or Southeast Asian communities where the majority of people have straight hair, voluminous curly or afro-textured hair may also be seen as an oddity.

Big Hair, Don't Care, a children's book by Crystal Swain-Bates and Megan Bair, was published by Goldest Karat Publishing in 2013. The book is designed to improve self-esteem and confidence among children with naturally voluminous hair.

== See also ==
- Afro
- Beehive (hairstyle)
- Frizz
- List of hairstyles
- Natural hair movement
