= Frizz =

Hair that does not align with the surrounding hair

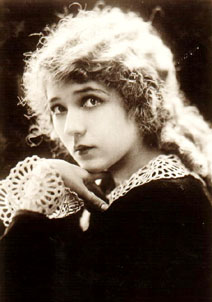
Silent film star Mary Pickford in 1919

Frizz is hair that does not align with the surrounding hair, but stands up or curls independently, creating a fuzzy or irregular texture. The three main causes of frizz are genetics, hair damage, and humidity. Frizzy hair can be seen as a positive or a negative trait depending on the current fashion and one's personal preference. Many hair products, such as gels, pomades, and hair waxes, are designed to reduce frizz.

== Definition ==
There is more than one definition of frizz. Researchers who studied the perception of hair health found that while women around the world perceived the absence of frizz as a sign of healthy hair, how they described "frizz" varied widely according to hair type and desired style. As described by women in the study, the two main types of frizz are:

1. short strands sticking up at the part and throughout the hair length that "project away from the main body of hair"; this type is especially noticeable on women with straight hair who are trying to achieve a smooth style; and
2. strands of wavy or curly hair that do not align with others to form a defined wave or curl.

By this definition, frizz is not exclusively a characteristic of curly hair; straight hair can be frizzy, and tightly curled or afro-textured hair can be frizz-free. "Frizz" sometimes refers to curly hair in general, but that is not what most people understand the term to mean.

== Causes ==
According to cosmetic chemist Randy Schueller, the three main causes of frizz are genetics, damage, and humidity.

=== Genetics ===
Some wavy or curly hair naturally aligns or "clumps" in a clearly defined, consistent pattern, and some does not. Curly hair that does not have natural curl definition appears frizzy and is sometimes mistakenly characterized as damaged.

Even when hair has a defined curl pattern, combing or brushing it when it is dry can break up the clumps, causing the hair to expand into a frizzy mass. This is often done intentionally to add volume. Blow-drying hair from the ends toward the roots can raise the hair's cuticle, resulting in frizz.

=== Damage ===
Although all hair is technically "dead", hair that has been damaged is perceived as less "healthy" than undamaged hair. Some styling techniques can cause breakage, chipping of the hair cuticle, and other forms of damage which contribute to frizz.

Excessive or rough brushing can cause breakage. This results in frizz because the hair is stretched out of shape before it breaks, so that the shorter hair that remains tends to spring outward, away from the main body of hair. Backcombing can be damaging, as can combing curly hair when it is dry. Excessive use of heat styling tools such as blow dryers and flatirons can weaken the hair, making it susceptible to breakage and split ends. Recommendations for minimizing heat damage include using heat styling tools set on low, using a diffuser when blow drying, and never using a curling iron or flat iron on wet hair. Direct heat can boil the water in the hair, causing bubbles to form inside the hair fiber, weakening the hair. Some authors recommend avoiding heat altogether, and allowing the hair to air-dry.

Other common causes of hair damage include the use of relaxers and other harsh chemicals; use of a razor to cut curly hair, which weakens the hair cuticle and promotes frizz; and harsh shampoos that strip the hair of its natural oils.

Having some hairs that are shorter than others is not necessarily a sign of breakage. Hair naturally sheds as it reaches the end of its growth cycle, and a new hair grows in its place; the average lifespan is about six years.

=== Humidity ===
In a humid environment, moisture penetrates the hair shaft and is absorbed into the cortex, causing the proteins there to swell. Different kinds of proteins absorb moisture and swell differently, causing the hair shaft to twist and bend in an irregular pattern. To prevent this, Schueller recommends using conditioners and styling products that contain dimethicone, which repels humidity.

Although moisture causes frizz, which many women perceive as "unhealthy", many women also believe that moisture is good for their hair, and buy moisturizing hair products. In reality, these products are designed to smooth the surface of the hair rather than increase the hair's water content.

== Perception and treatment ==
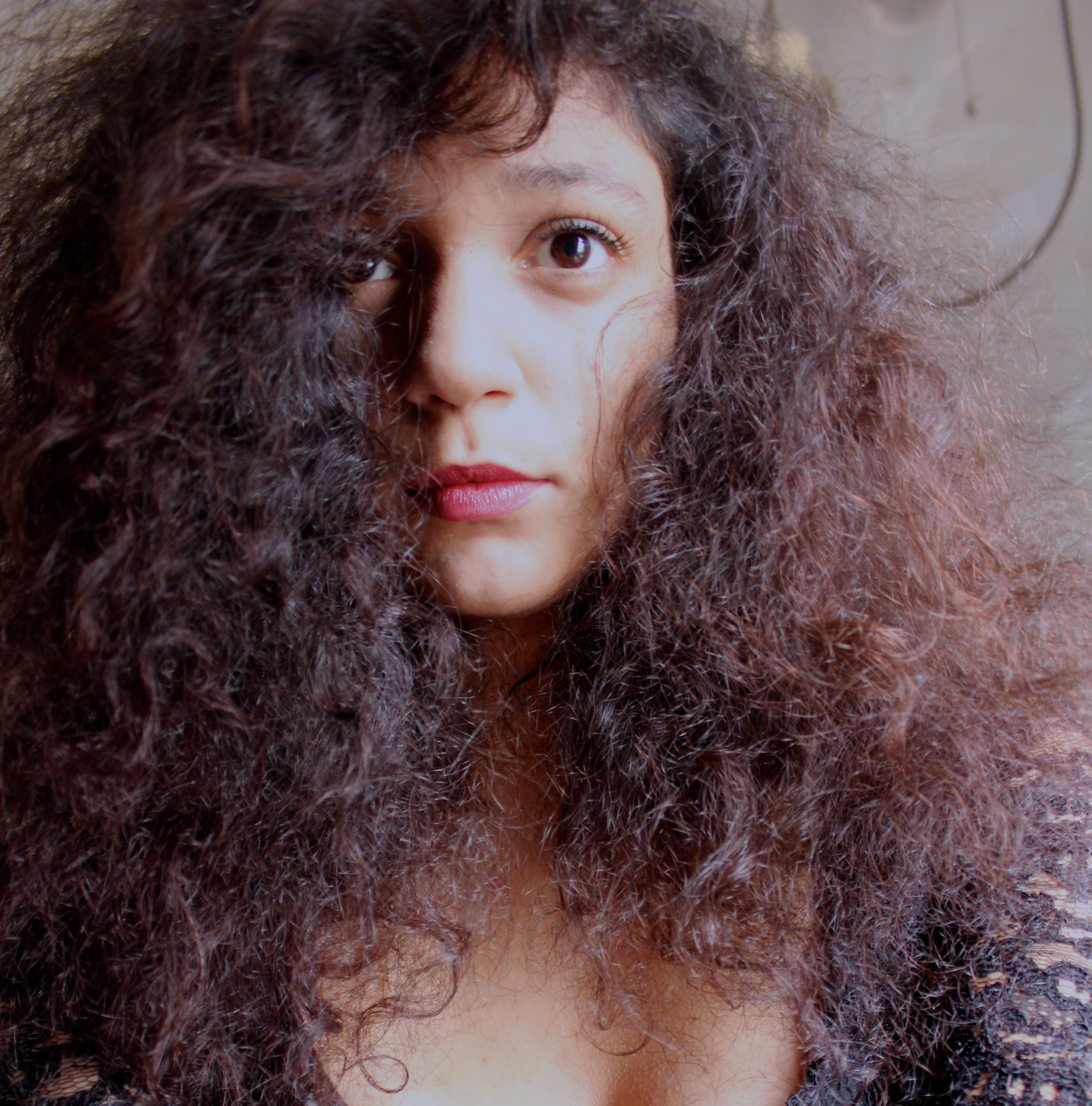
Young woman with frizzy hair.

Frizzy hair has been perceived differently in different eras and cultures. Publicity photos of the silent film star Mary Pickford were often backlit, highlighting her halo of frizz, and the frizzy perm was a mainstay of 1980s Western fashion. In the 1979 film My Brilliant Career, when the frizzy-haired Sybylla threatens to cut off all her hair, her aunt Gussie replies, "It'd be a pity to lose your finest asset." Today, some people embrace their natural frizz, while others see it as a problem in need of a solution, and advertisements for hair products often present it as such.

Those looking for ways to reduce frizz encounter a great deal of conflicting information online and in the media. Products and treatments that work well for one person may not work for another due to factors such as curl pattern, hair density, hair porosity, the amount of sebum produced, whether the individual strands are coarse or fine, protein levels (which are affected by one's diet), allergies to certain ingredients, regional humidity levels, and finally, subjective ideals of beauty. Moreover, some of the methods used to smooth frizz can cause damage, making hair even more frizz-prone than before; for example, flatirons can burn the hair (see Damage, above), and some hair gels contain drying ingredients. Some experts recommend the use of products containing silicones, while others warn that silicones can cause buildup. Myriad products such as serums, pomades, and hair waxes are designed to reduce frizz, and each has its advocates and detractors.

Some relatively non-controversial recommendations for reducing frizz include regular use of instant, deep, and leave-in conditioners; occasional hot oil treatments; and regular trims to remove any split ends or damaged tips.

== See also ==
- Curly Girl Method
- Hair gel
- Hair mousse
- Hair straightening
- Hair wax
- Natural hair movement
- Pomade
- Split ends

== Bibliography ==
- Milady Standard Cosmetology. Cengage Learning. 2011. ISBN 9781439059302.
- Blume-Peytavi, Ulrike; Whiting, David A.; Trüeb, Ralph M. (2008). Hair Growth and Disorders. Springer Publishing. ISBN 9783540469117.
- LaFlesh, Teri (2010). Curly Like Me: How to Grow Your Hair Healthy, Long, and Strong. John Wiley & Sons. ISBN 9780470536421.
- Marsh, Jennifer; Gray, John; Tosti, Antonella (2015). Healthy Hair. Springer Publishing. ISBN 9783319183862.
