= Digital perm =

Hairstyling technique

A digital perm is a perm that uses hot rods with the temperature regulated by a machine with a digital display, hence the name. The process is otherwise similar to that of a traditional perm. The name "digital perm" is trademarked by a Japanese company, Paimore Co. Hairstylists usually call it a "hot perm."

A normal perm requires a perm solution and a neutralizer. A digital perm requires a (different) solution plus heat. This type of perm is popular in several countries, including South Korea and Japan.

== Difference between a normal perm and a digital perm ==
The biggest difference between other perms and a digital perm is the shape and the texture of the wave created by the digital process. A normal perm, or "cold perm," makes the wave most prominent when the hair is wet, and loose when it is dry. The hair tends to look moist and as locks. A digital perm makes the wave most prominent when the hair is dry, and loose when it is wet. Therefore, the dry and curly look of the curl iron or the hot curler can be created.

Digital perms thermally recondition the hair, though the chemicals and processing are similar to a straight perm. The hair often feels softer, smoother, and shinier after a digital perm.

== Cost and time of a digital perm ==
The price depends on the hair salon, but a digital perm is usually a little more expensive than a cold perm. Also, some hair salons have systems where they can use the machine one at a time, in which case the price could be a lot higher.

The time it takes to perm the hair also depends on the hair salon and the hair type, but it usually takes longer than a cold perm. In some cases, it takes about the same time, but different salons use different solutions and machines, so the time varies.

== Styling ==
A cold perm makes the hair most wavy when it is wet, so adding styling gel/foam when it is wet and air-drying it makes the wave most prominent. A digital perm makes the hair wavy when it is dry, so it can be dried with a blow dryer, and a hand can be used to make the curl. Styling is very easy, and if the curl is set in the morning, at the end of the day when the wave loosens, the curls can be revived by curling around a finger.

== See also ==
- Haircut
- List of hairstyles
