= Hair roller =

Small tube that is rolled into a person's hair in order to curl it

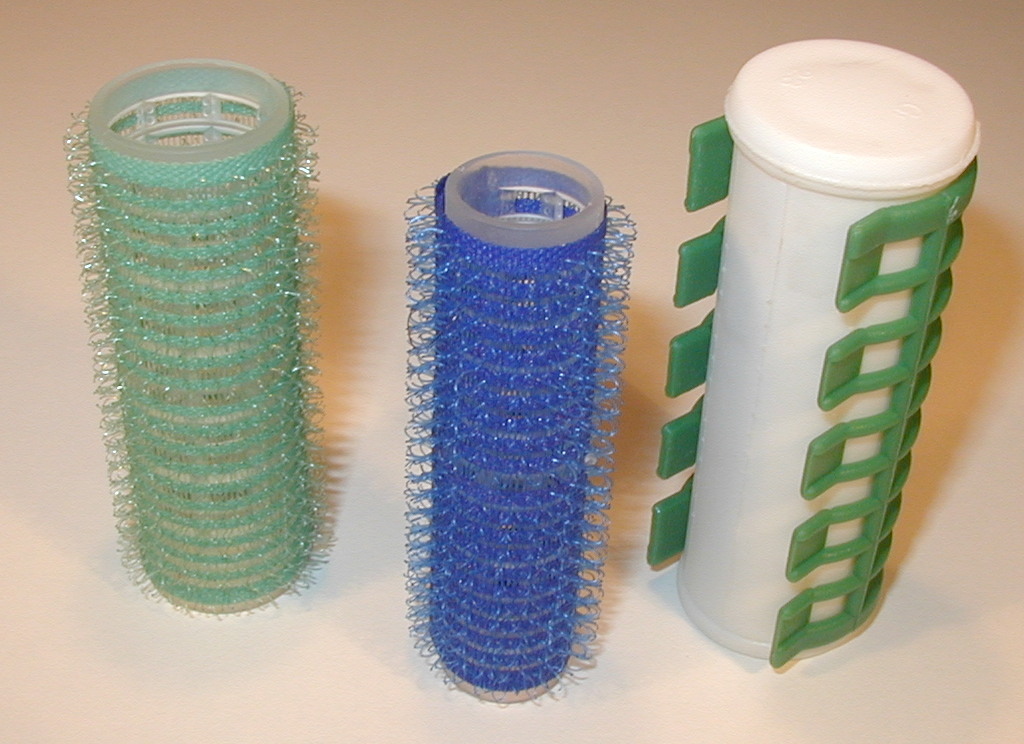
Three hair rollers of different diameters.

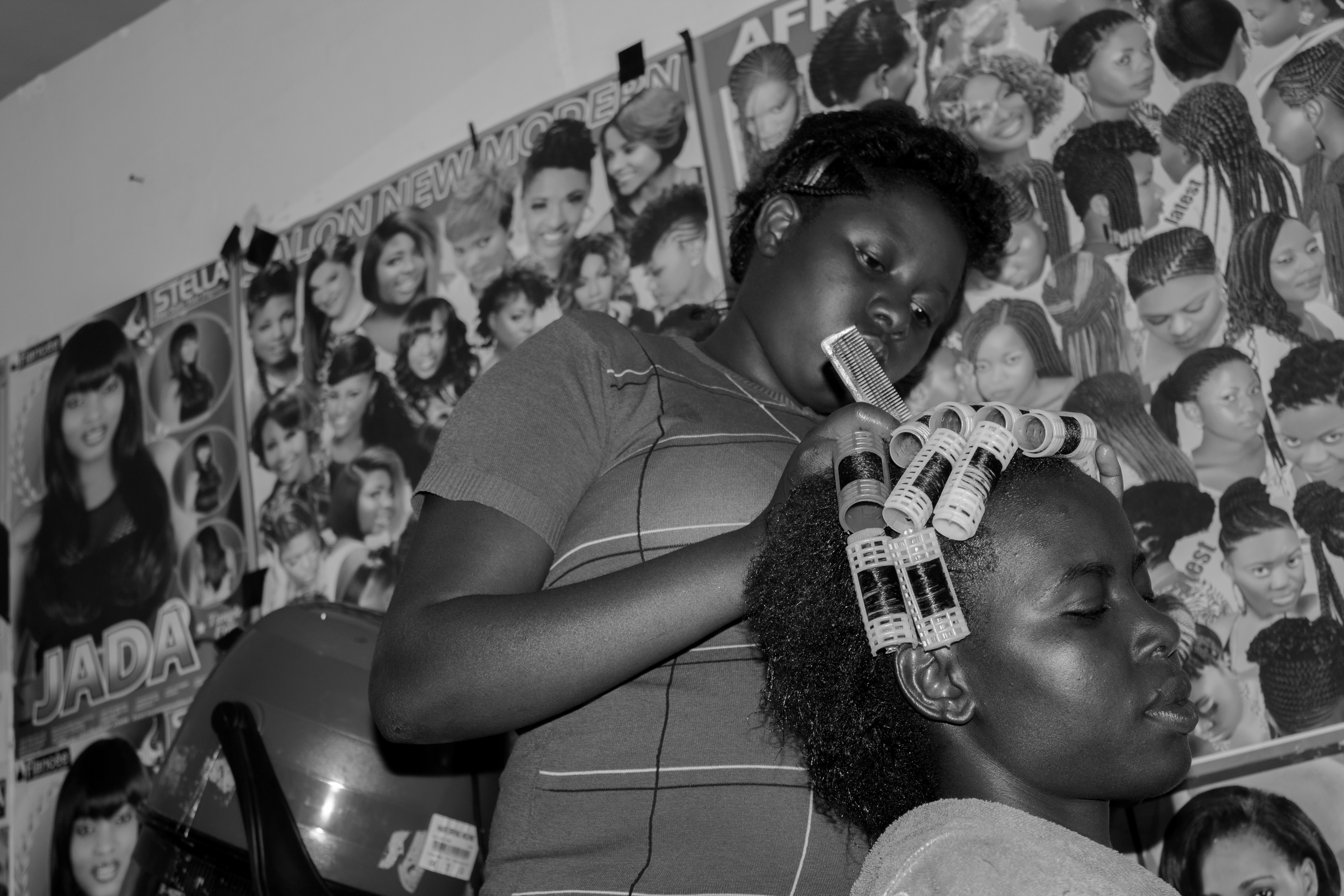
Hair rollers in Tanzania

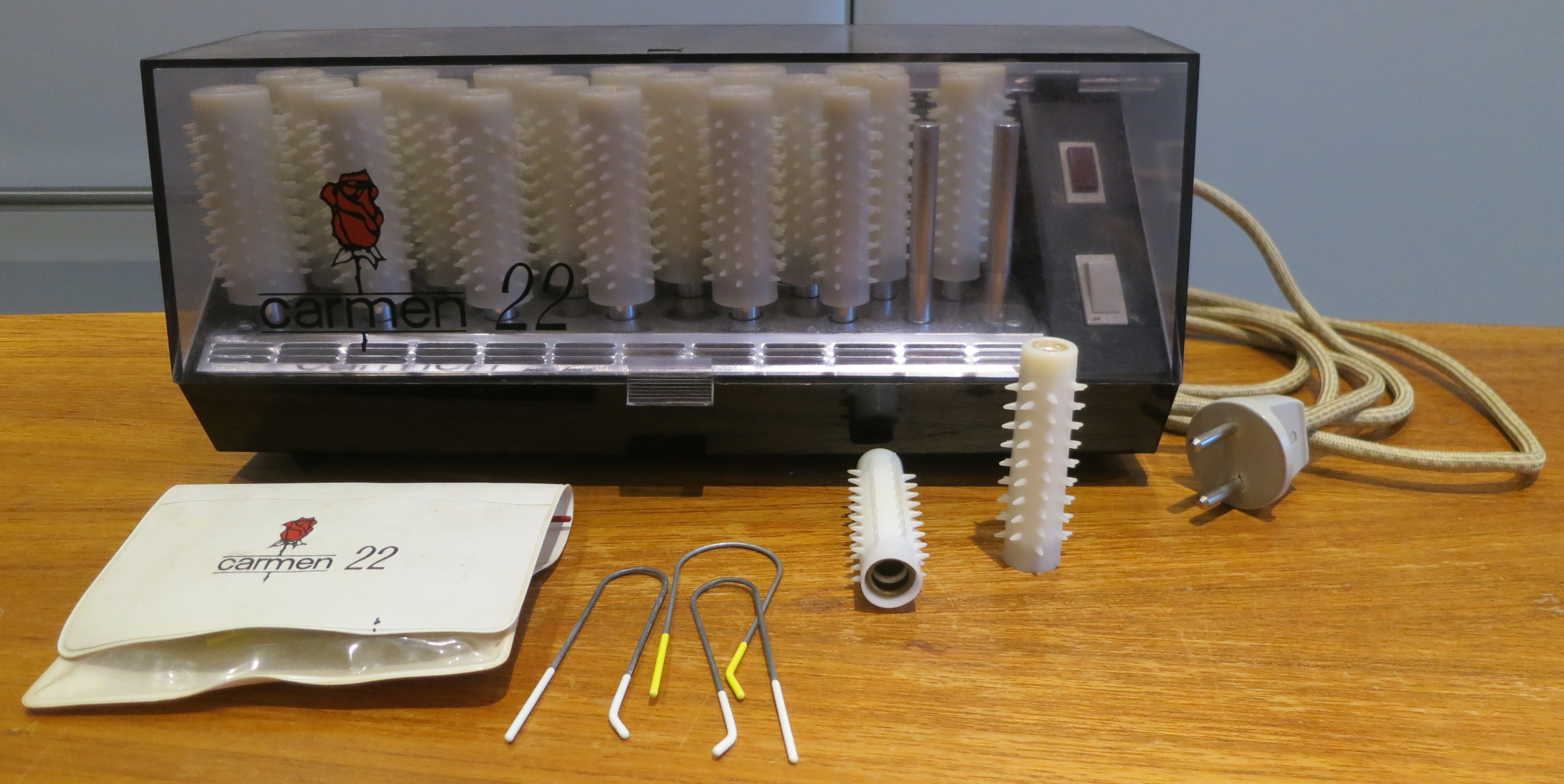
1960s Carmen hair roller heating device

A hair roller or hair curler is a small tube that is rolled into a person's hair in order to curl it, or to straighten curly hair, making a new hairstyle.

The diameter of a roller varies from approximately 0.8 inches (20 mm) to 1.5 inches (38 mm). The hair is heated, and the rollers strain and break the hydrogen bonds of each hair's cortex, which causes the hair to curl. The hydrogen bonds reform after the hair is moistened.

A hot roller or hot curler is designed to be heated in an electric chamber before one rolls it into the hair. Alternatively, a hair dryer heats the hair after the rolls are in place. Hair spray can temporarily fix curled hair in place.

In 1930, Solomon Harper created the first electrically heated hair rollers, then creating a better design in 1953.

In 1968 at the feminist Miss America protest, protesters symbolically threw a number of feminine products into a "Freedom Trash Can". These included hair rollers, which were among items the protesters called "instruments of female torture" and accoutrements of what they perceived to be enforced femininity.

== Velcro hair roller ==
A Velcro hair roller is made of a strip of hook and loop fasteners that is wrapped around cylinders. They are available in different sizes and can be used on dry or wet hair. The rollers are self-holding because they do not need pins or clips to be held in place and do not need heat to be applied to create the curls. Typically kept in the hair for about fifteen minutes. To clean Velcro hair rollers hair should be removed from them and then soaked in shampoo and water mixture followed by a vinegar solution to remove any excess oil or dirt.

== See also ==
- Barrette
- Hair iron
- Hairdresser
- Hot comb
- Scissors
- Shampoo and set
