= Punch perm =

Japanese male hairstyle

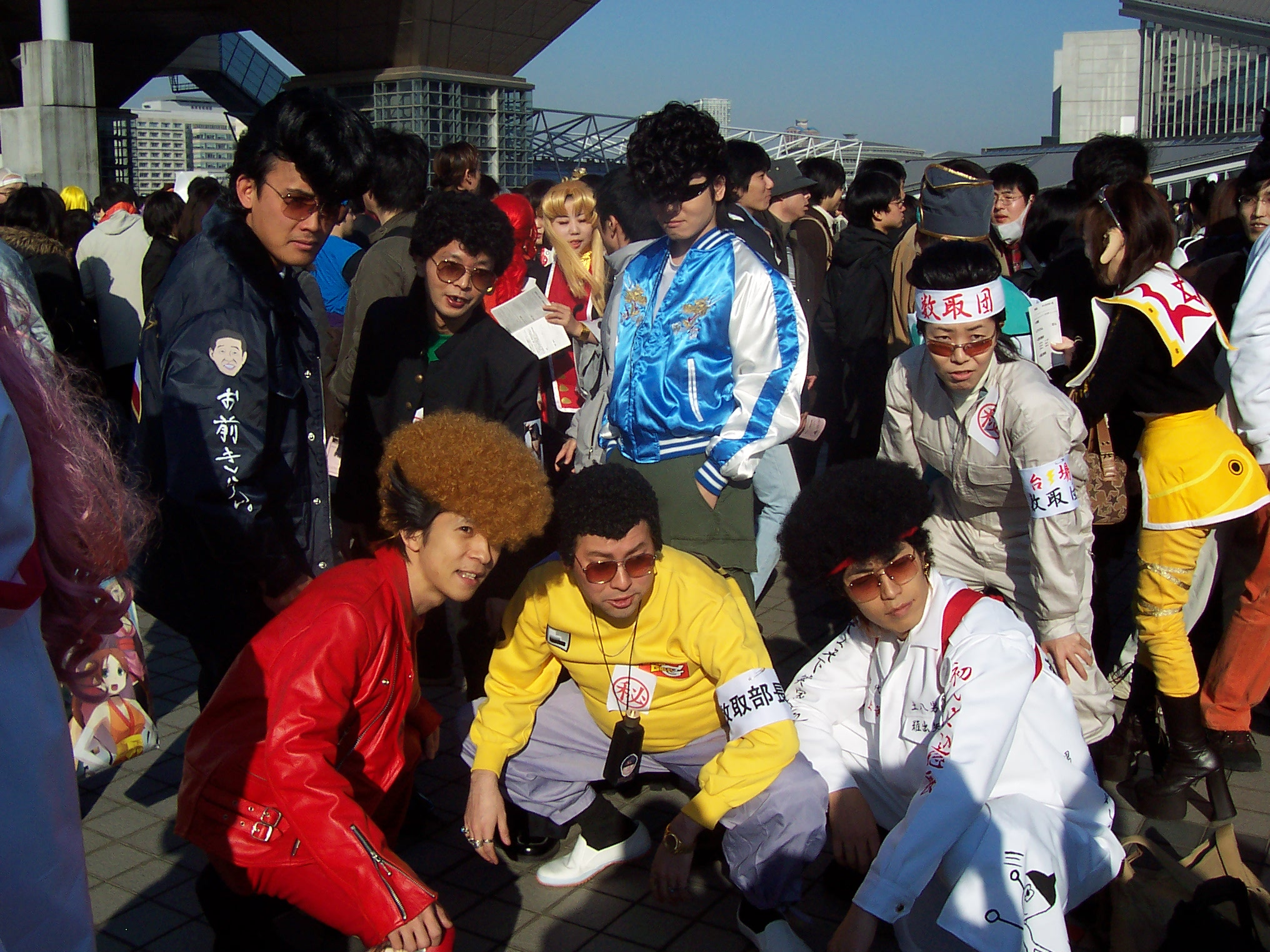
The cosplayer in yellow has a punch perm.

A punch perm (パンチパーマ, panchi pāma) is a type of tightly permed male hairstyle in Japan. From the 1970s until the mid-1990s, it was popular among yakuza, chinpira (low-level criminals), bōsōzoku (motorcycle gang members), truck drivers, construction workers, and enka singers. The punch perm began to fall out of usage as a result of its general association with the yakuza, as well as normal fashion trends. The style is similar to the Jheri curl, which was popular in the United States during roughly the same time frame, but the curls in a punch perm are much tighter.

== History ==
The hairstyle was invented by Shigemi Naganuma, a Japanese barber at the hair salon Naganuma in Kokurakita-ku, Kitakyūshū in the 1960s. He based the style on Afro-textured hair. At that time, hair irons were round and could not hold the hair tightly. Naganuma modified the iron by filing it into a hexagonal shape, like a pencil, which created a tighter hold. He originally named the style "champion press", however, it came to be called "punch perm". According to one theory, the name is because of its punchy and powerful appearance.

In the present day, few barbers are trained in creating the punch perm due to a fall in demand and the rise in Japanese men having their hair cut at salons, rather than barbershops.

== See also ==
- List of hairstyles
- Waves (hairstyle)
- Quiff
