= Perm (hairstyle) =

Hairstyle featuring artificial curls

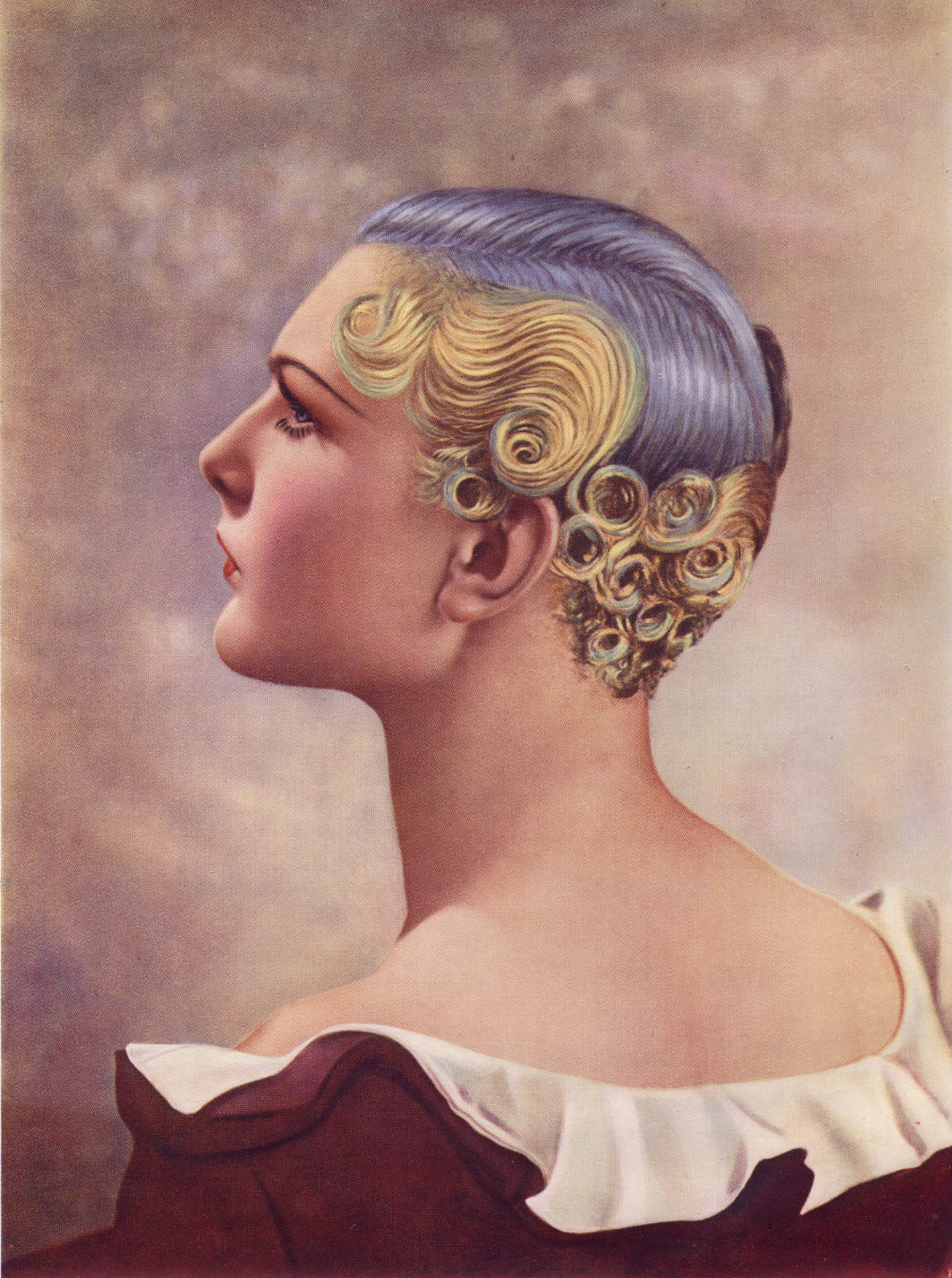
First Prize won at the Hairdressing Fashion Show London, 1935, using an Icall permanent-waving machine. The hair is even shorter than in the 1920s, revealing the ears and neck. The colors were achieved by adding pigments to the setting lotion.

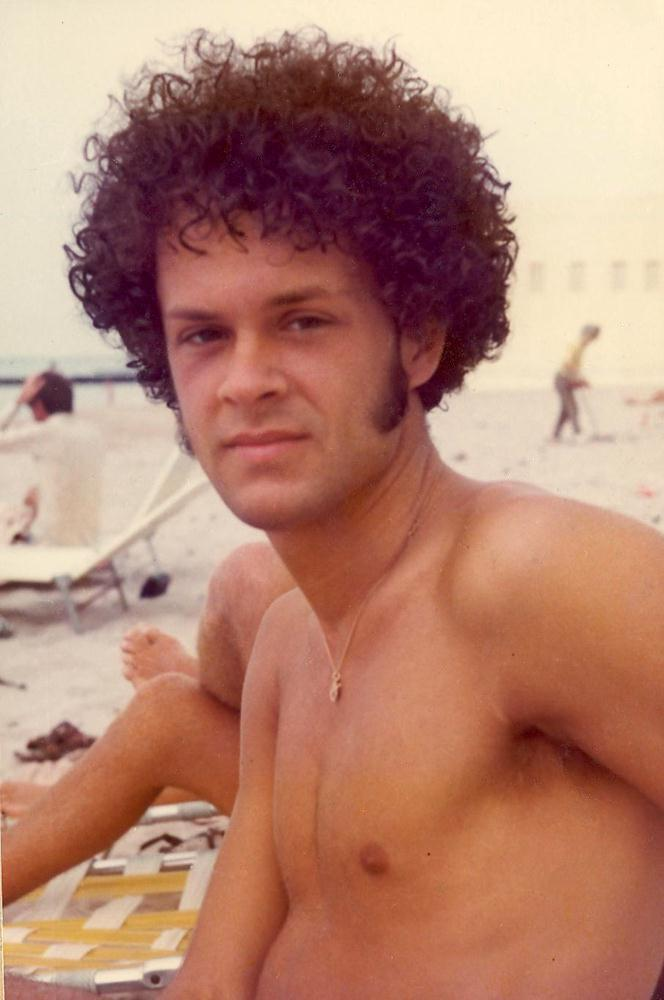
Afro permanent on a male resident of Miami Beach in 1972

A permanent wave, commonly called a perm or permanent (sometimes called a "curly perm" to distinguish it from a "straight perm"), is a hairstyle consisting of waves or curls set into the hair. The curls may last a number of months, hence the name.

Perms may be applied using thermal or chemical means. In the latter method, chemicals are applied to the hair, which is then wrapped around forms to produce waves and curls. The same process is used for chemical straightening or relaxing, with the hair being flattened instead of curled during the chemical reaction.

== History ==
The first person to produce a practical thermal method was Marcel Grateau in 1872. He devised a pair of specially manufactured tongs, in which one of the arms had a circular cross-section and the other a concave one, so that one fitted inside the other when the tongs were closed. The tongs were generally heated over a gas or alcohol flame and the correct temperature was achieved by testing the tongs on a newspaper; if the paper browned slightly it was about right. The waving itself was safe if care was taken to keep the tongs away from the scalp. The procedure was to comb a lock of hair towards the operator, moving the comb slowly with one hand to maintain some tension, while applying the tongs to the hair successively down the lock of hair towards the point. Each time the tongs were applied, they were moved slightly in a direction normal to the lock of hair, thus producing a continuous flat or two-dimensional wave. Skill using the wrist could produce slight variations of the wave. Thus, Marcel waving produced a two-dimensional wave, by thermal means only and the change was produced by plastic flow of the hair, rather than by any chemical means. Because of the high temperature used, the process tended to degrade the hair. However, in spite of its drawbacks, forms of Marcel waving have persisted until today, when speedy results and low cost are important.

In the Western world, long hair was standard for women until the 1920s, when flappers cut their hair short (into a "bob") as a form of rebellion against tradition. As the demand for self-determination grew among women, hair was shortened so that it did not pass the lower end of the neck. This was not only a political gesture but a practical one, as women began to take over men's work due to the great shortage of labour during the First World War. At the same time, electricity, which had been introduced mainly for lighting and industrial use, began to be used for heating and the application of the electric motor at the small business and domestic level. Shorter hair was improved in appearance by waving even more than long hair, and soon an improved form of waving would appear.

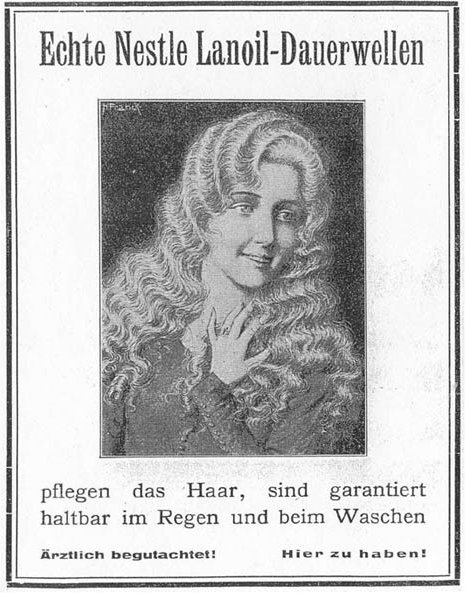
Early 20th century advertisement for Nessler's permanent wave machine

=== Nessler ===
An early alternative method for curling hair that was suitable for use on people was invented in 1905 by German hairdresser Karl Nessler. He used a mixture of cow urine and water. The first public demonstration took place on 8 October 1905, but Nessler had been working on the idea since 1896. Previously, wigs had been set with caustic chemicals to form curls, but these recipes were too harsh to use next to human skin. His method, called the spiral heat method, was only useful for long hair. The hair was wrapped in a spiral around rods connected to a machine with an electric heating device. Sodium hydroxide (caustic soda) was applied and the hair was heated to 212 °F (100 °C) or more for an extended period of time. The process used about twelve 2-pound (0.9 kg) brass rollers and took six hours to complete. These hot rollers were kept from touching the scalp by a complex system of countering weights which were suspended from an overhead chandelier and mounted on a stand. Nessler conducted his first experiments on his wife, Katharina Laible. The first two attempts resulted in completely burning her hair off and some scalp burns, but the method was improved and his electric permanent wave machine was used in London in 1909 on the long hair of the time.

Nessler had moved to London in 1901, and during World War I, the British jailed Nessler because he was German and forced him to surrender his assets. He escaped to New York City in 1915, buying passage on a steamship under an assumed name. In New York, he found that hundreds of copies of his machine were in use, but most did not work well and were unreliable. Nessler opened a shop on East 49th Street, and soon had salons in Chicago, Detroit, Palm Beach, Florida and Philadelphia. Nessler also developed a machine for home use that was sold for fifteen dollars. However, his machine made little impression in Europe and his first attempts were not even mentioned in the professional press, perhaps because they were too long-winded, cumbersome and dangerous.

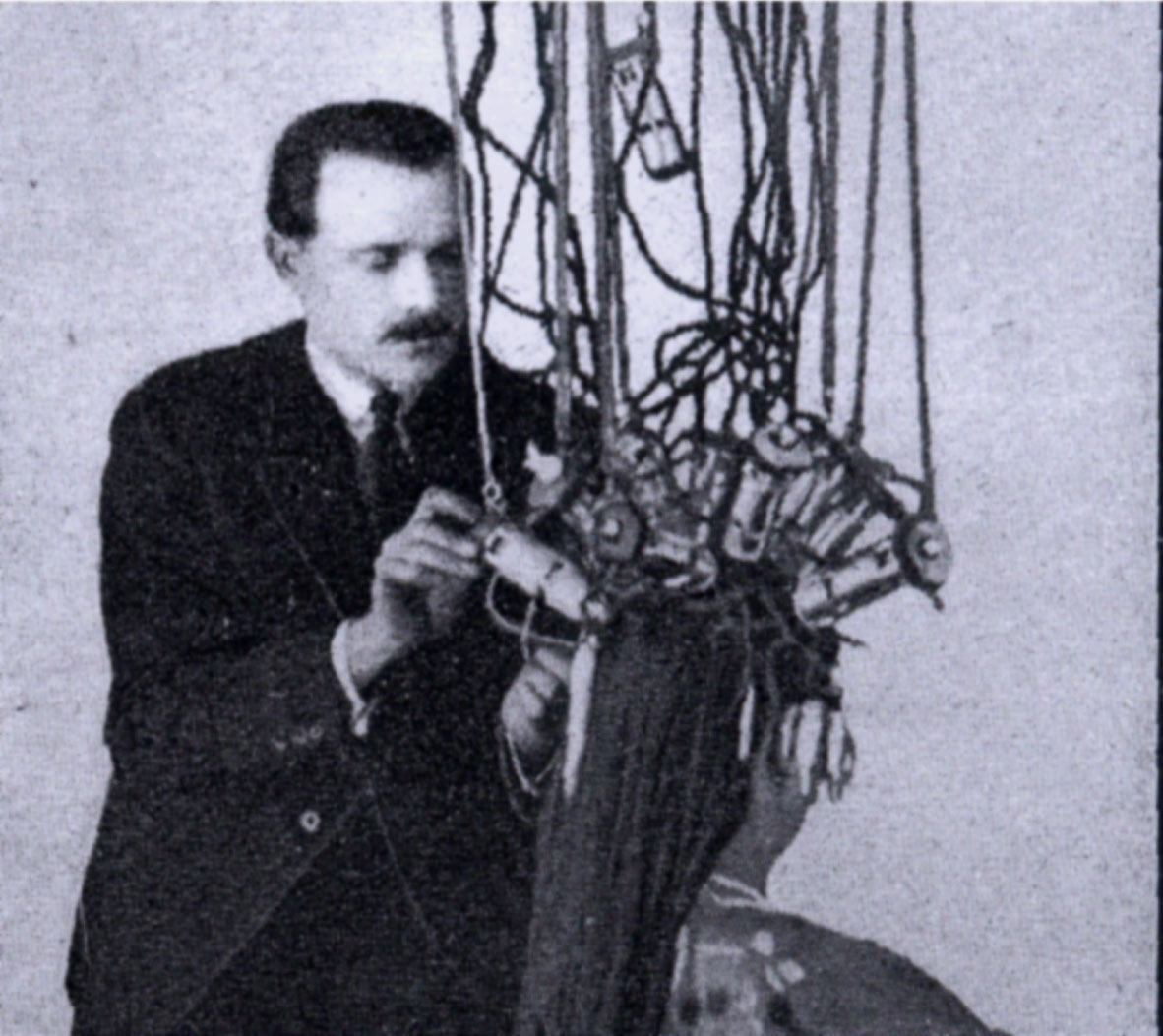
Eugene Suter using early heaters designed by Isidoro Calvete. The heaters had two windings that heated the ends and roots separately

=== Eugene Suter and Isidoro Calvete ===
Eugene Suter was a Swiss immigrant who set up a fashionable ladies' salon in London's West End. He claimed to have come from Paris, which in those days was the center of fashion and style. He became aware of the possibilities of electrical permanent waving particularly when shorter hair allowed the design of smaller equipment. The system had two parts; one was the electric heater and the other was the system of winding and holding the hair on a form which was inserted into a heater. Suter tried to design a heater, but was unsuccessful.

Isidoro Calvete was a Spanish immigrant who set up a workshop for the repair and manufacture of electrical equipment in the same area of London in 1917. This equipment was just coming into use for the hairdressing and medical professions. Suter consulted him on the heater and Calvete designed a practical model consisting of two windings inserted into an aluminium tube. This ensured that when inserted over a root winding, the thicker hair nearer to the root became hotter than the thinner hair at the end. Suter patented the design in his own name and for the next 12 years ordered all his hairdressing equipment from Calvete but marketed under his commercial name, Eugene Ltd, which became synonymous with permanent waving throughout the world. At the same time, Calvete developed his own products which he manufactured under the name Icall, Ltd. The simultaneous manufacture of two competing lines would inevitably result in conflict.

Eugene company had a factory in Edgware Road, London. Its products included colour rinses, lustre-lending shampoos, setting lotions and patented steaming sachets as well as its curlers and electric dryer. At least two dozen of the steaming sachets were used for each perm. The company published its own magazine, The Eugène Waver, which was sent to hairdressers across the country. It covered advice on using Eugène products, styling techniques and hairdressing trends. Readers were referred to as ‘Eugène wavers’. The National Art Library at the V&A Museum holds volumes of the magazine covering the period 1928 to 1947. During the war, the company made millions of screws and rivets for airplanes and tanks in its factory. The company’s name was so well known that a 1945 page advertisement in Good Housekeeping magazine consisted of a blank page with just the handwritten words:

‘What would you like for Christmas?' 'Oh, a Eugène wave, please!’

From the onset, Eugene had realised the importance of the United States market and made great inroads, challenging Nessler who had started up there. The former also sued the latter for infringing the patent which he had taken out based on Calvete's design, and won his case. Nessler was to retaliate some years later suing Eugene in the United Kingdom, over some curlers designed by Calvete which were similar to the Nessler ones.

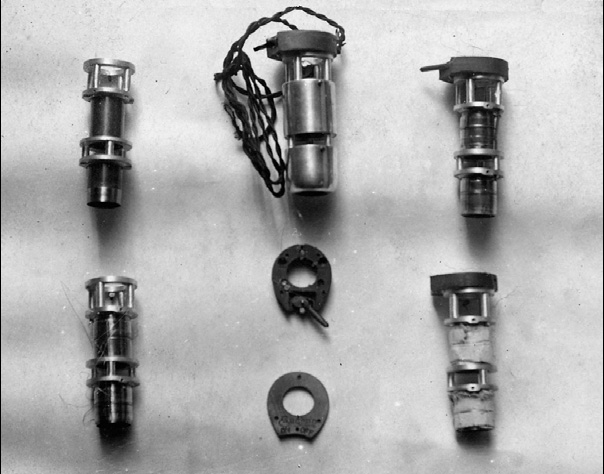
First permanent-waving heaters designed by Calvete in 1917

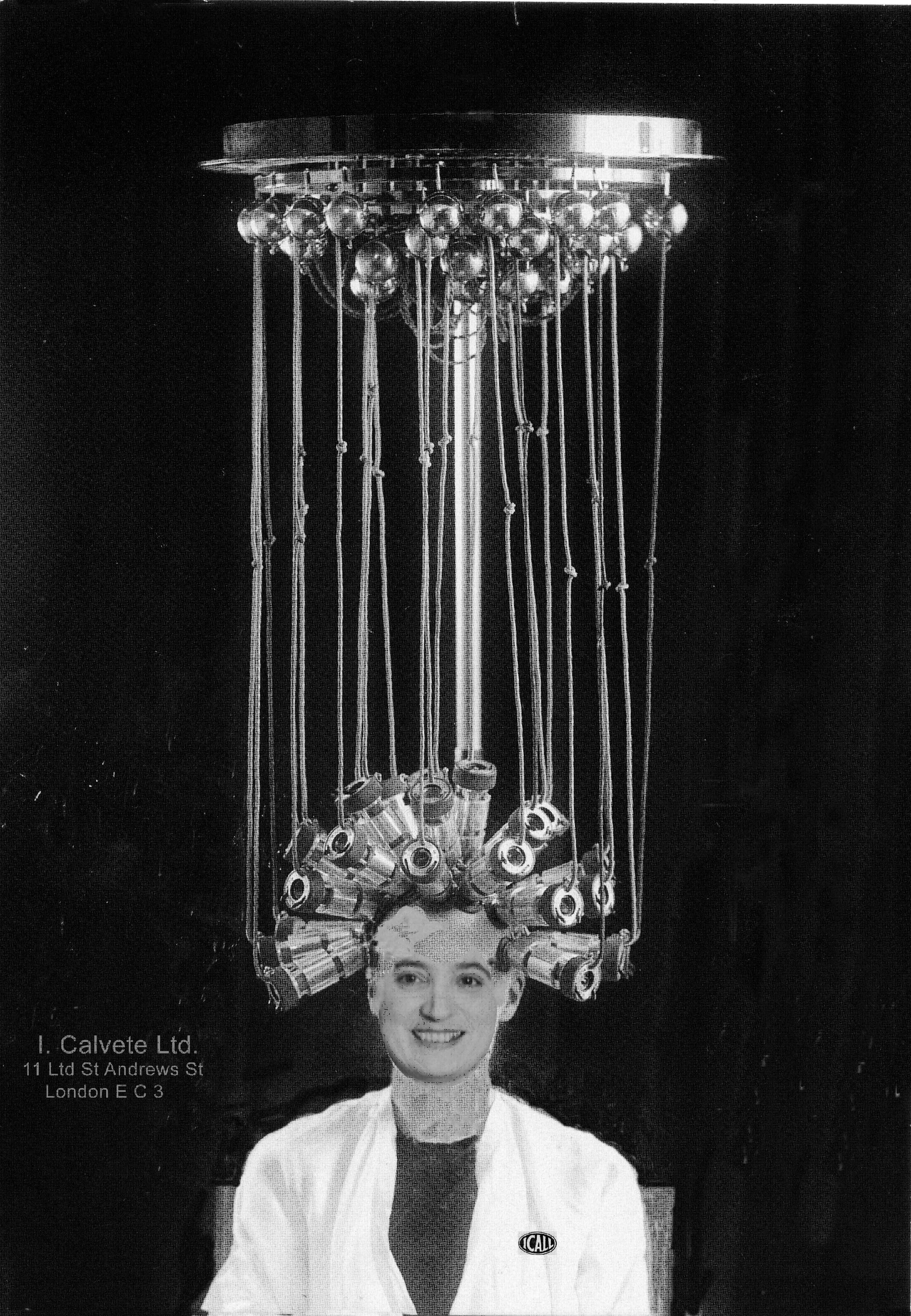
Machine made in 1923 by Icall for Eugene

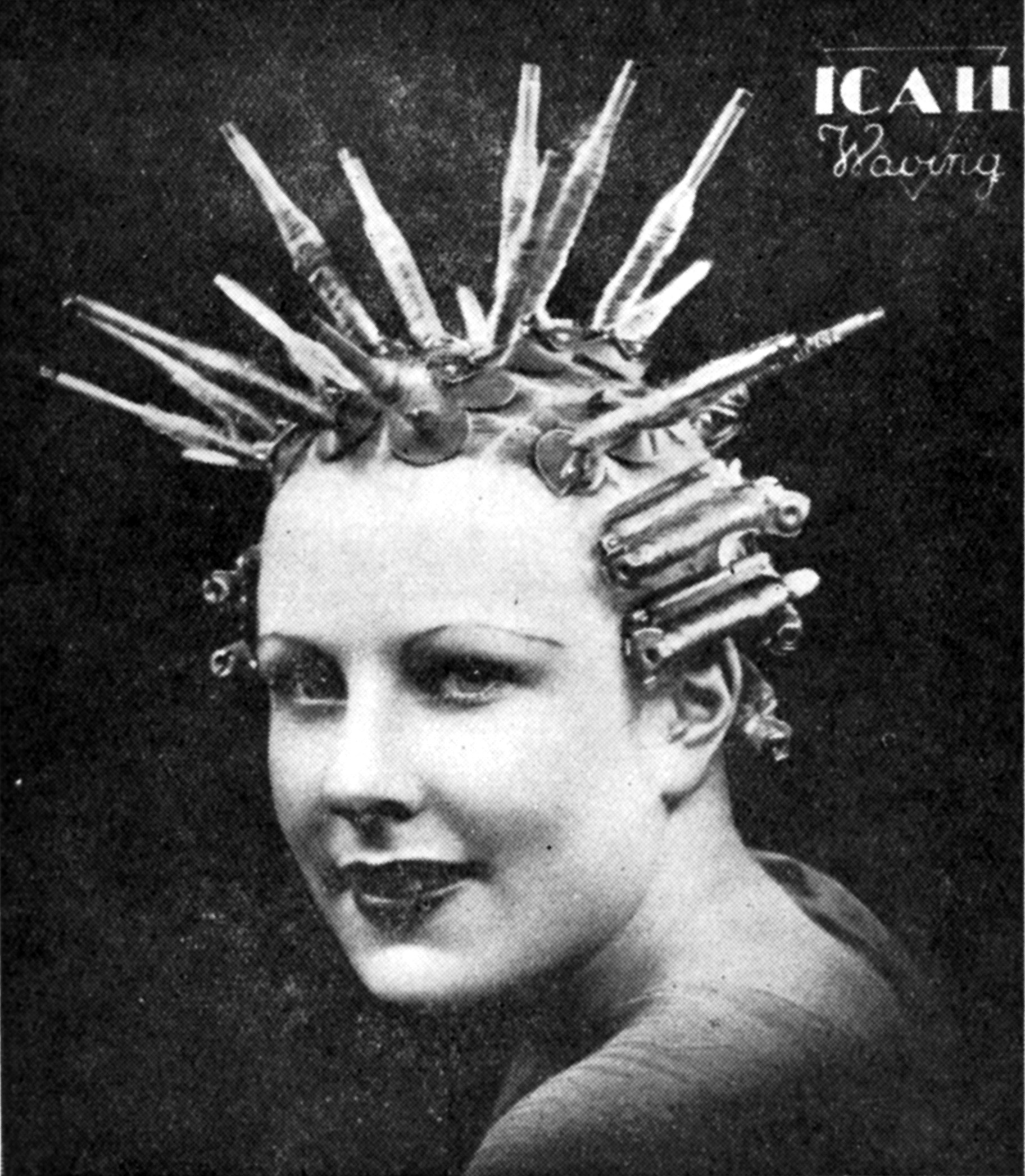
Hair wound ready for perming. Root winding on top to take tubular heaters, Point winding on sides to take croquignole heaters. 1934

==== Development of the heaters ====
The first heaters as described above were tubular, and were inserted over the hair which had been previously wound on to a form or curler. To facilitate this, after a preliminary preparation of the hair, such as washing, cutting or tapering, the hair was combed into up to about 22 sections or locks, a process known a sectioning or squaring off. Each lock of hair was then wound onto the curler (which was basically a rod standing perpendicular to the head), starting at the bottom using the hair nearest the scalp and proceeding spirally up the curler for the length of the lock. For this reason, the process was colloquially referred to as root winding. Considerable ingenuity was exercised in designing the curler to minimize the time, effort and difficulties entailed in winding. In early models, the heaters had a tendency to flop downward on to the head, but with improved designs, they tended to point outwards (see illustration).

A second type of curler was invented later, allegedly in 1924 by a Czech hairdresser called Josef Mayer. In this method, the hair was fed through a small clamp which, after winding, would hold the two ends of a roller. The ends of the hair were held on the roller which was wound around a point until it reached the clamp into which it was inserted. For obvious reasons, this was called point-winding. Mayer attempted to claim a patent on this method of winding, which was challenged in a Federal lawsuit by the National Hairdressers' and Cosmetologists' Association.

Calvete designed a new type of heater for this called a croquignole heater which fitted over the winding, rather like a bulldog clip. The trend was to replace some of the tubular heaters on the sides of the head with croquignole ones, to allow greater scope of styling.

==== Development of the units ====
Apart from portable models which became available later, some system of support was necessary for the curlers. At first these were fixed to the ceiling, but these were soon replaced by a machine that was universally adopted. A vertical metal pipe held a circular unit, called a "chandelier" from which the heaters were suspended. The bottom of the pipe was mounted on a base with wheels which enabled the device to be moved easily between clients or to one side of the salon. By providing a structure from which to distribute the electricity to the heaters, as well as to keep all of them in the correct position and orientation, the chandelier helped minimize the weight of the entire system while also keeping things tidy.

Because of expense, the early models only had a few tubular heaters, and permanent-waving process took place in more than one stage. As the process became more popular and competitive, a whole head of hair could be processed in one sitting, using up to 22 heaters, some of which might be croquignole.

==== Development of the "reagents" ====
Although heat was required for perming, it was soon realized that if an improvement had to be made over the Marcel method, other means were necessary to avoid overheating and to speed up the waving process. The use of water on its own was an obvious choice, particularly as the hair was already wet from washing, for no other reason than that it prevented overheating, and that steam seemed to improve the process (hence the expression "steaming time"). It was not long before experiments were carried out on the use of additives, and it was soon apparent that alkaline additives improved the results.

Thus the profession started using what was called a "reagent", perhaps concocted by the hairdresser himself or sold commercially by the manufacturers of the machine. Two common ingredients were borax and ammonia, which are mildly alkaline (having a high pH) but are relatively harmless.

=== J. Bari-Woollss ===
Until about 1930, most progress was empirical, that is, each hairdresser tended to use a method which he had found to be useful. By then, although some academic work had been done on the subject of hair, Calvete felt that more research should be done on the chemistry of hair, and engaged a chemist by the name of Bari-Woollss, who specialized in the subject. He carried out controlled experiments on known factors such as the effect of heat, water/steam and alkalinity and experimented on variations of the winding process, such as the type of hair, the tension or tightness of winding, the flatness of winding, the overlap and pitch. His practical lectures on the subject proved highly popular among hairdressing professionals, and he wrote a book on the subject.

Certain basic factors he pointed out are still relevant today. A point winding is almost two dimensional, rather like the spring of a watch spiral. A root winding is three-dimensional much like a spiral staircase or, more properly, a helix. Thus point winding tends to produce more of a curl, but both produce waved hair when pulled slightly. Point produces a thicker winding and so heat takes longer to penetrate the core of the winding. Root winding is heated over a greater length and the thickness of the winding will depend on the overlap between turns.

Bari-Woollss was probably instrumental in introducing a new factor-redox reduction. In chemistry, this is the opposite of oxidation and can mean the removal of oxygen or, in this case, the addition of hydrogen, which by breaking the bonds of the keratin in the hair, allowed waving to take place more easily. This resulted in addition of a sulfite, bisulfite or metabisulfite to Icall reagents, sulfur dioxide, a reducing agent, being evolved on heating. The only alternative to sulfites at the time would have been mercaptans which are unpleasant to use. However, later alternatives were found which led to the development of cold-waving. Bari-Woollss left Icall in about 1934 to take over the editorship of an encyclopedic volume on women's hairdressing.

=== Developments after 1930 ===
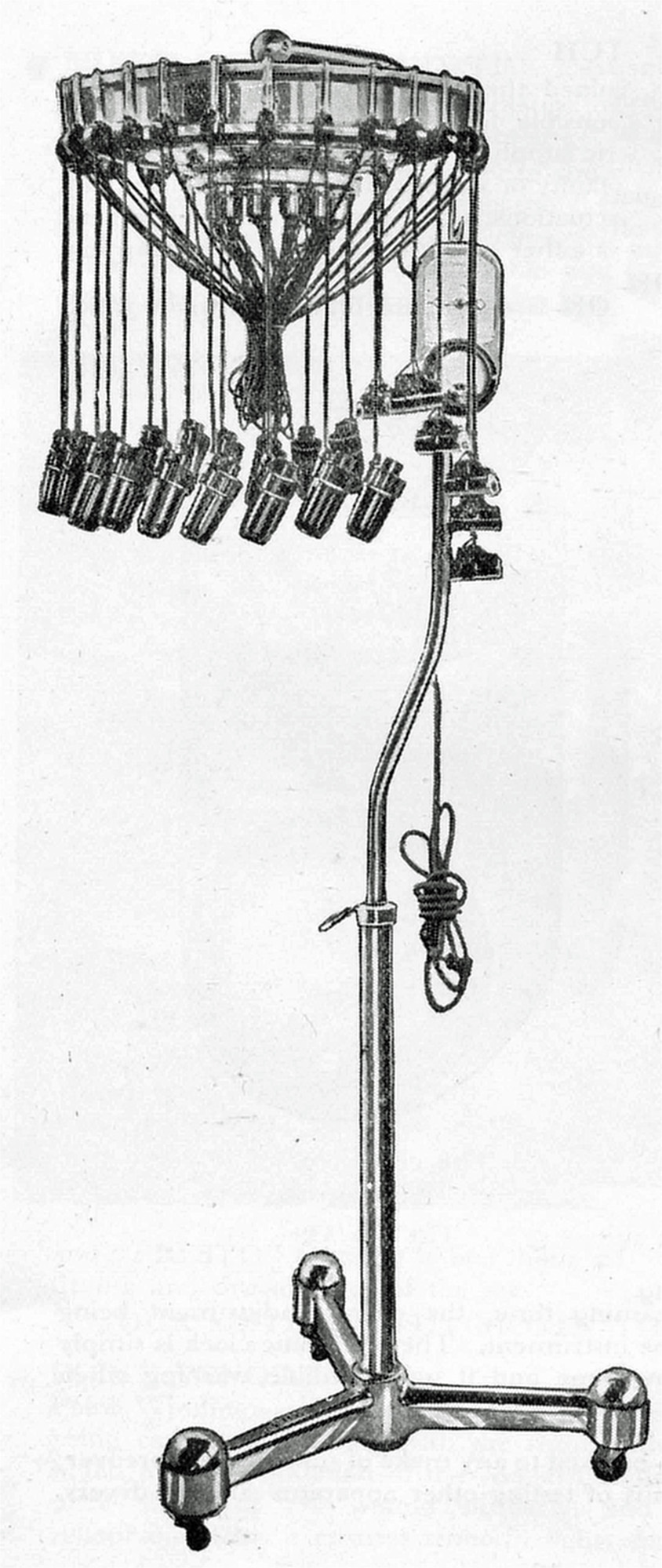
State-of-the-Art Machine made by Icall in 1934, fitted with Bakelite heaters and a timer which compensated for the type of hair and other factors. The wheels were designed to avoid pick-up of hair from the salon floor. The design incorporated 15 tubular heaters and 6 croquignole.

By 1930, the process of permanent-waving was well established and its importance can be gauged if one considers that the majority of middle-class women, at a rough estimate, had their hair set once a week and permed perhaps once every three months as new hair replaced the waved hair. Meanwhile, hairdressers sought to improve the process and reduce the work involved; this meant savings at the lower end of the market and yet more women getting their hair permed. This was also stimulated by pictures of the rich and famous, particularly film stars, who all had their hair permed.

This resulted in many copies of the original equipment being made by reputable firms in some cases with innovations of their own:

- Nestlé. Nessler re-entered the British market under this name, introducing the "Radione" system in which the hair was wound dry and inserted into hollow cellophane tubes sealed at both ends, but contained moistened paper. Also introduced the "oleum" system in which water was replaced by oil.
- MacDonald. A revolutionary system, as it did not use direct electrical heating. Steam was generated in a separate kettle, or later in small individual kettles, the steam being led by tubes to each "heater". Arrangements had to be made to remove the condensed water, but there was no risk of overheating nor of electric shock, but scalding was a risk.
- Gallia originated by J. Metelski, is credited with first moistening the hair with a reagent. which gave better results but made winding more difficult. It was said to be a very fast system.
- Superma originated by Sartory, was a machineless system that relied on the chemical reaction of the contents of a cotton pad, with water. Temperature control was rather more difficult but the method was popular in the United States perhaps because electricity was not used.
- Wella-Rapide was a German system that used croquignole heaters exclusively. A chandelier was not used and for safety worked at a reduced voltage.
- Frigidine was one of the few, apart from Icall, to use a timing mechanism and Bakelite heaters.
- Vapeur Marcel was a French machine based on the same principles as the MacDonald.

The manner in which reagents worked when applied to the hair and heated, was not only due to the chemicals they contained, but also the effect of the water. Water not only played a part in "steaming" the hair, but there was better heat control, because while there was water, the temperature hardly passed 100 °C. However, this evaporated the water, and it was found that by wrapping the windings with aluminium foil, the hair stayed moist for longer, and also kept the windings upright, facilitating the addition of the heaters.

A further advance was the use of so-called sachets: small absorbent pads containing certain chemicals, attached to foil or other waterproof material, such as vegetable parchment. The sachets were placed in water and then wound rapidly round the curlers. These were popular with hairdressers as a labour-saving device, and with manufacturers, as they were only used once and some 20 would be used for a head of hair.

There were also changes in the equipment. Icall pioneered the use of plastics in hairdressing equipment, specifically a thermosetting plastic, (Bakelite) which was used not only because of its electrical properties in the windings of motors and heaters, but in the outer coverings of the heaters. They were less affected by corrosion and were less likely to burn the fingers of the hairdresser. Icall also used Bakelite for the outer casings of hand-held hair-dryers and also for the large linings of pedestal hair-dryers.

It can be imagined that at a time when electrical installations were not to today's standards and at one time were not even grounded, the application of electrical windings to wet hair resulted in enough accidents to worry women. Icall developed what was called the "wireless" system, in which the electric lead to the heater was replaced by a cord that took the weight of the heater, and the heater was heated by plugging into a socket in the chandelier. Outwardly, the machine looked similar to the earlier model, but at no time was there an electric potential near the head.

Also during this time, in the United States a machine-less method that applied preheated clamps over the wrapped rods was invented, In 1931, at the Midwest Beauty Show in Chicago, Ralph L. Evans and Everett G. McDonough showed a heatless system for the first time. Their method used bi-sulfide solution and was often applied at the salon, left on while the client went home and removed the next day, leading it to be called the overnight wave.

With the outbreak of World War II in 1939, all production of such equipment stopped in Europe and hardly recovered afterwards, being replaced either by home heater kits or cold-waving methods.

In the 1960s and 1970s, Dorothy Matthews-Paynter introduced perms to Bermuda.

== Modern perms ==
=== Cold wave ===
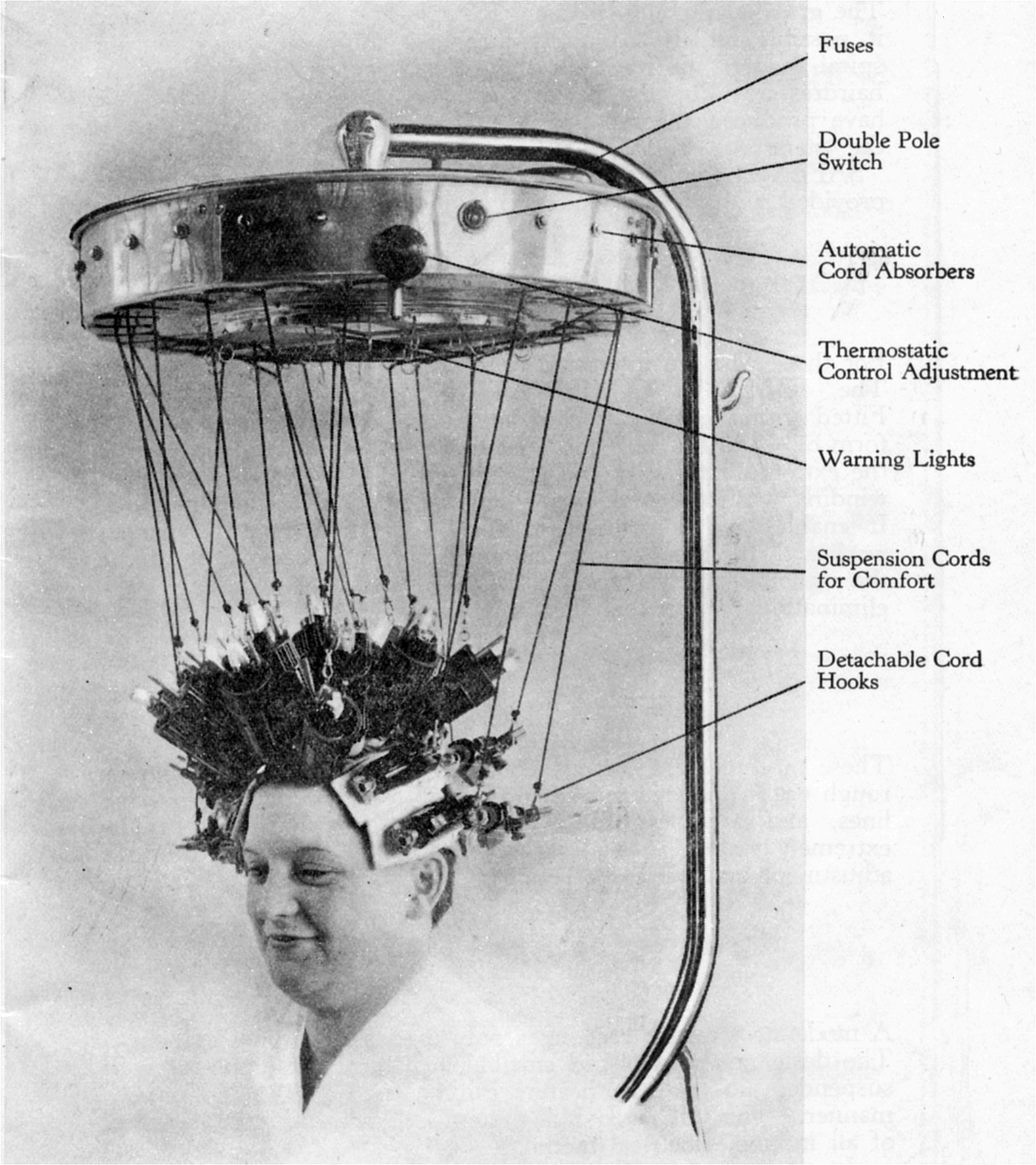
A Wireless Permanent-Waving Machine designed by Icall in 1934, in which the heaters were disconnected before applying to the head, known as the "falling-heat" method. The heaters were bulkier so as to store more heat, since they began to cool as soon as applied. The heat was controlled according to the type of hair by a thermostat control.

In 1938, Arnold F. Willatt invented the cold wave, the precursor to the modern perm. It used no machines and no heat. The hair was wrapped on rods and a reduction lotion containing ammonium thioglycolate was applied. This chemical breaks open the disulfide linkages between the polypeptide bonds in the keratin; the protein structure in the hair. The disulfide bonds give hair its elasticity, and can be reformed with chemicals. Next, an oxidation lotion—hydrogen peroxide—was applied to close the disulfide bridges again, and the hair was reformed to the shape of the rod. The entire process took 6–8 hours at room temperature.

In the 1970s, acid perms were invented. These ammonia-free acid perms, sometimes called buffered waves, use glyceryl monothioglycolate in the place of ammonia. Acid perms, or buffered wavers, are slower but gentler to the hair. Heat is usually added by placing the client under a dryer, after covering the wrapped head with a plastic cap. The reaction is endothermic and the additional heat causes the pH to rise from 6.9 to 7.2.

Perms today use this method with sodium thioglycolate instead of ammonium thioglycolate, at a pH of 8 to 9.5. Perming hair with the sodium thioglycolate method takes only 15–30 minutes of exposure to the sodium thioglycolate solution before a neutralizer solution is applied to bring the pH back to normal and re-bond the hair.

The permanent relaxer straightens the hair instead of curling it. The same chemical methods can be used for this, but the hair is not wrapped around rods.

=== Other modern perms ===
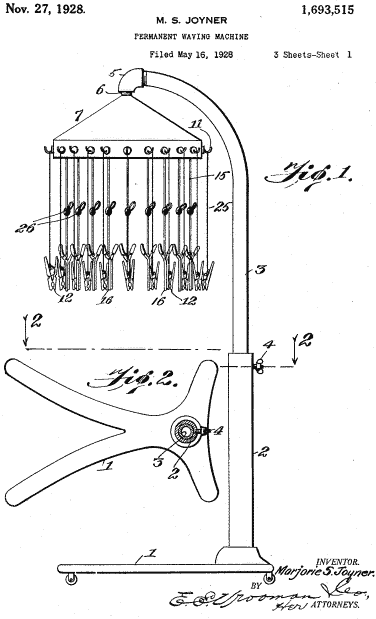
Permanent wave machine invented in 1928 by Marjorie Joyner — The first African American woman to receive a patent

Other types of modern perms include exothermic perms, which are self timing and self heating; and neutral, or low pH, thioglycolate free perms.

Digital perms were introduced in the 21st century and in use especially in modern Asian cultures. The process was patented and invented by a Japanese company, Paimore Ltd.

== Technical considerations ==
There are two parts to a perm: the physical action of wrapping the hair, and the chemical phase. Both of these can affect the result. Important physical variables involved are what type of rod is used, how the hair is wrapped and how end papers are used. The two most common types of rods are straight and concave; each giving a different curl effect. The wrapping method is either spiral or croquignole, and various types and the positioning of end papers can be used with any combination of the above. Generally, smaller rods will produce smaller, tighter curls and increase the appearance of shortening the hair.

The chemical solution used in the perming process is determined by the client's hair type and the pH of the solution. Classic alkaline perms are used for stronger, coarser hair. They work at room temperature and usually contain ammonium thioglycolate in the pH range of 9-10. Acid perms are used on more delicate or thinner hair. They require outside heat application and usually contain glyceryl monothioglycolate (GMT) in the pH range of 6.5-8.2. Glyceryl monothioglycolate is considered a recent innovation in perming technology due to its high curling power near the pH of hair. This allows hair cuticles to remain closed during the perming process, minimizing damage to the hair structure.

== Home perms ==
A number of brands of home permanent kits were available since the invention of the 'cold wave' in the 1940s, but their numbers have decreased as permanent waves are not as popular as they were in the 1980s. The first popular home permanent was the TONI brand produced by the Toni Home Permanent Company (founded by brothers Neison and Irving Harris) at its facility in Forest Lake, Minnesota. The Toni company used a set of twins to advertise their products; one with a salon perm and one with the home perm. They introduced a number of types and brands over the next four decades (Silkwave, UnCurly, Tonette, Silver Curl, Prom, Scatter Perm, Lightwaves, Epic Waves) and a formula to remove curl: Curl-Free. The other popular brand was LILT by soap manufacturer Procter & Gamble which included a foam perm in a can called "Push Button" Lilt and a 'Milk Wave' that used fresh milk as part of the lotion as well as a children's perm. Other types of perms included no-lotion perms that used specially treated end papers to produce the wave (PACE, SELF) and self-neutralizing perms that needed no neutralizer but had to set by drying the hair on the perm rods after rinsing out the wave solution. No-mix liquid neutralizers were introduced as many perms were air-neutralized or used a powder that was mixed with water or a powder/liquid combination. Other brands included Richard Hudnut, Ogilvie, Revlon and Nutri-Tonic. At the peak of the second wave of popularity in the 1970s and 1980s, a number of new brands and types of perms were introduced including no-ammonia perms and "soft" perms (Rave) which guaranteed no-frizz results even on bleached or tinted hair, as well as temporary perms that lasted only a few weeks before washing away, leaving hair in virtually the same condition as before. Other types included customized versions that let consumers adjust the curl level before making it permanent and spot perms that let certain parts of the hair be curled (bangs, crown, ends), leaving the rest of the hair untouched. Another brand that was a household name in Britain in the late 1960s and 1970s was Twink (home perm).

== See also ==
- List of hairstyles
- Punch perm
- Shampoo and set
