= Backcombing =

Type of hair styling

Backcombing, also known as teasing or ratting, is a way of styling hair to create volume. It is done by repeatedly combing the hair towards the scalp, causing the hair to tangle and knot.

== Notable wearers ==
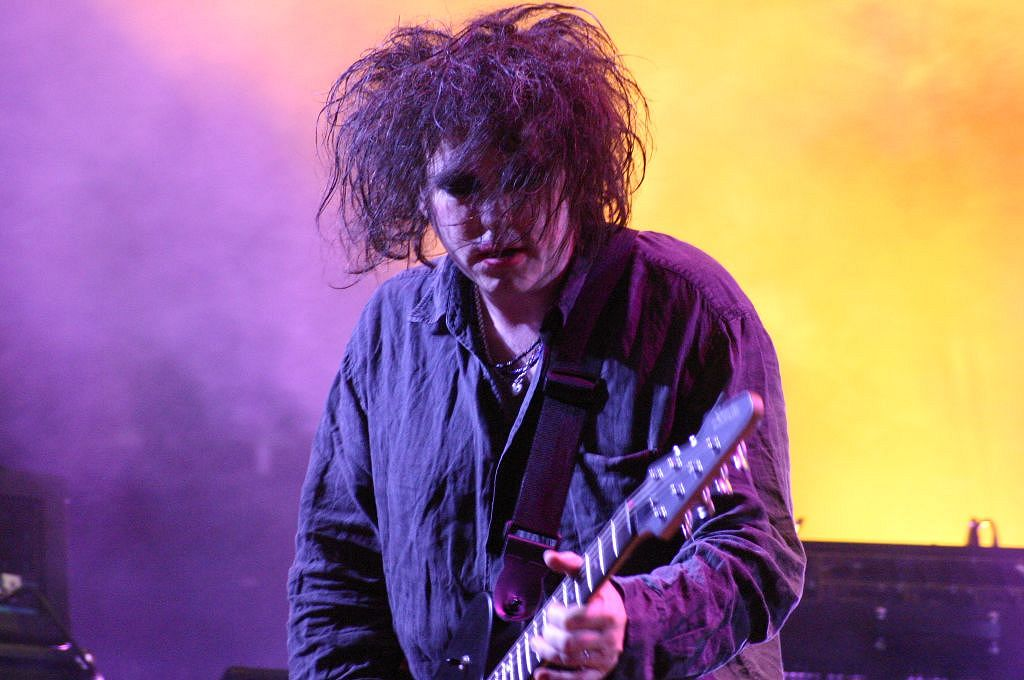
Robert Smith performing in 2004

- Russell Brand, English podcaster and former comedian
- Helena Bonham Carter, English actress
- The Crystals, American girl group
- Noel Fielding, English comedian
- Brandon Jacobs, English musician
- Cyndi Lauper, American singer
- Tim Minchin, Australian musical comedian
- The Ronettes, American girl group
- Faris Rotter, English singer
- Siouxsie Sioux, English singer and songwriter who inspired Robert Smith's look
- Robert Smith, English singer and musician
- Joshua Third, English musician
- Harry Wade, English musician
- Amy Winehouse, English singer

== Overview ==
Backcombing is a part of big hair styles such as beehives, bouffants, and dreadlocks. Because it rubs against the scales of the hair's cuticle, it can cause serious and progressive damage to the hair's integrity; this leads to weakening and breakage over time, and frequent backcombing is not recommended for people who want to maintain long hair. It can also cause tangles near the root that are very difficult to remove.
