= Crew (disambiguation) =

A crew is a group or class of people who work at a common activity.

- For a specific sporting usage, see rowing crew.
- For filmmaking usage, see film crew.
- For live music usage, see road crew.
- For analogous entities in research on human judgment and decision-making, see team and judge–advisor system.
- For stagecraft usage, see stage crew.
- For video production usage, see television crew.
- For crews in aviation and the airline industry, see groundcrew and aircrew.
- For crews in human spaceflight, see astronaut.
- Tank crew
- Boat crew

Crew may also refer to:

- Crew (comics), a Czech comic magazine published from 1997 to 2003
- Crew (company), a technology company in Montreal, Canada
- "Crew" (song), by GoldLink (2017)
- Crew (surname), a surname and notable people with the name
- Crew, County Londonderry, a townland in Northern Ireland
- Crew cut, a type of haircut
- Columbus Crew, an American Major League Soccer team from Columbus, Ohio
- Crew rowing, a team sport
- Crew (film), a 2024 Indian Hindi-language heist comedy film

== Abbreviations ==
- Citizens for Responsibility and Ethics in Washington, U.S. government ethics and accountability watchdog organization
- Commercial Real Estate Women, a professional association for women in real estate
- Concurrent Read Exclusive Write, an access model for parallel RAM in computers
- Corkscrew Regional Ecosystem Watershed, a conservation in Florida
- Center for Conservation and Research of Endangered Wildlife, a breeding program for endangered wildlife at the Cincinnati Zoo and Botanical Garden

== See also ==
- Crewe (disambiguation)
- The Crew (disambiguation)
- Krew (disambiguation)
- Crew's Hole, Bristol, an industrial area in east Bristol, England
- Krewe, a group that puts on a parade or ball for Carnival
