= Crewe (disambiguation) =

Crewe is a town in Cheshire, England.

Crewe may also refer to:

== Places ==
- Crewe (crater), a crater on Mars named after the English town
- Crewe (UK Parliament constituency), a defunct House of Commons constituency
- Crewe, Virginia, United States
- Crewe Green, a village and civil parish to the east of Crewe, England, historically named Crewe
- Crewe railway station, a large railway station serving the town of Crewe, England
- Crewe and Nantwich, Cheshire, England
- Crewe-by-Farndon, Cheshire, England

== Other ==
- Crewe (surname)
- Crewe Offley (1682–1739), British landowner and Whig politician
- Crewe United F.C., an intermediate-level football club in Northern Ireland
- Baron Crewe, an extinct title in the Peerage of the United Kingdom
- Marquess of Crewe, an extinct title in the Peerage of the United Kingdom
- Sara Crewe, the main character in the children's novel A Little Princess by Frances Hodgson Burnett
- Corporate Representatives for Ethical Wikipedia Engagement (CREWE), an organization of public relations officials and Wikipedia editors

== See also ==
- Lord Crewe (disambiguation)
- Crew (disambiguation)
- Krew (disambiguation)
