= Crewe (surname) =

Crewe or Crew is a surname of Old Welsh origin. People with this surname include:

- Albert Crewe (1927–2009), British-born American physicist and inventor of the scanning transmission electron microscope
- Amanda Crew (born 1986), Canadian film and television actress
- Bertie Crewe (1860–1937), British theatre designer
- Bob Crewe (1930–2014), American songwriter, singer, manager, and record producer
- Della Crewe (1884–1926), American long-distance motorcyclist
- Frances Crewe, Lady Crewe (1748–1818), English poet
- Francis Albert Eley Crew (1886–1973), British animal geneticist
- Gary Crew (born 1947), Australian writer of young adult fiction
- Sir George Harpur Crewe, 8th Baronet (1795–1844), English Tory politician
- Harvey Crewe (1941–1970), murder victims in New Zealand
- Henry Harpur Crewe (1828–1883), English clergyman and naturalist
- Hungerford Crewe, 3rd Baron Crewe (1812–1894), English landowner
- John Crewe (disambiguation), various persons of that name, including:
  - John Crewe, 1st Baron Crewe (1742–1829), British politician
  - John Crewe, 2nd Baron Crewe (1772–1835), British army general and art collector
- Lesley Crewe (born 1955), Canadian writer
- Nathaniel Crew, 3rd Baron Crew, Bishop of Oxford (1671–1674) and Bishop of Durham (1674–1721)
- Quentin Crewe (1926–1998), English journalist, author and adventurer
- Randolph Crew (cartographer) (1631–1657) English amateur cartographer
- Ranulph Crewe (1558–1646), English judge and Chief Justice of the King's Bench
- Rudy Crew (born 1950), former Superintendent of Schools of Miami-Dade County Public Schools in Florida, USA
- Thomas Crewe (1565–1634), English Member of Parliament and lawyer, Speaker of the House of Commons
- Tom Crewe (born 1989), English writer
- William Crewe (c. 1360 – 1403), English soldier and landowner
