= Ducktail =

Hairstyle

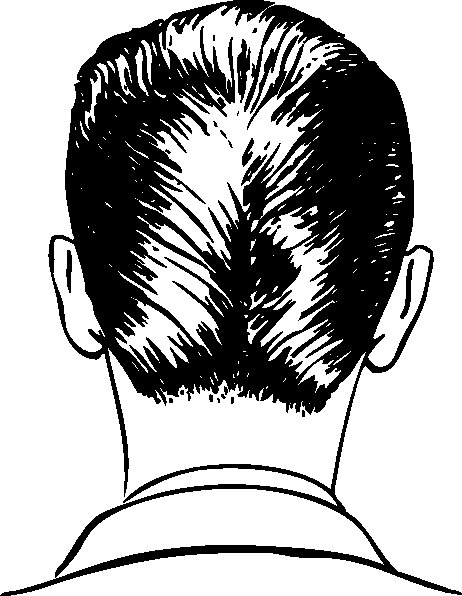
Duck's ass or D.A.

The ducktail is a men's haircut style popular during the 1950s. It is also called the duck's tail, duck's ass, duck's arse, or simply D.A., and is also described as slicked back hair. The hair is pomaded (greased), combed back around the sides, and parted centrally down the back of the head.

== History ==
Joe Cirello, a barber from Philadelphia, said he had invented the duck's ass in 1940, and he called the swung hair sides and their termination 'The Swing', after the musical style of the day. He claimed he had practiced on a lonely blind boy for about eighteen months. The duck's tail became an emblematic coiffure of disaffected young males across the English-speaking world during the 1950s. In Britain, it formed part of the visual identity of teddy boys and rockers, along with the quiff and the elephant's trunk.

== Combing technique ==
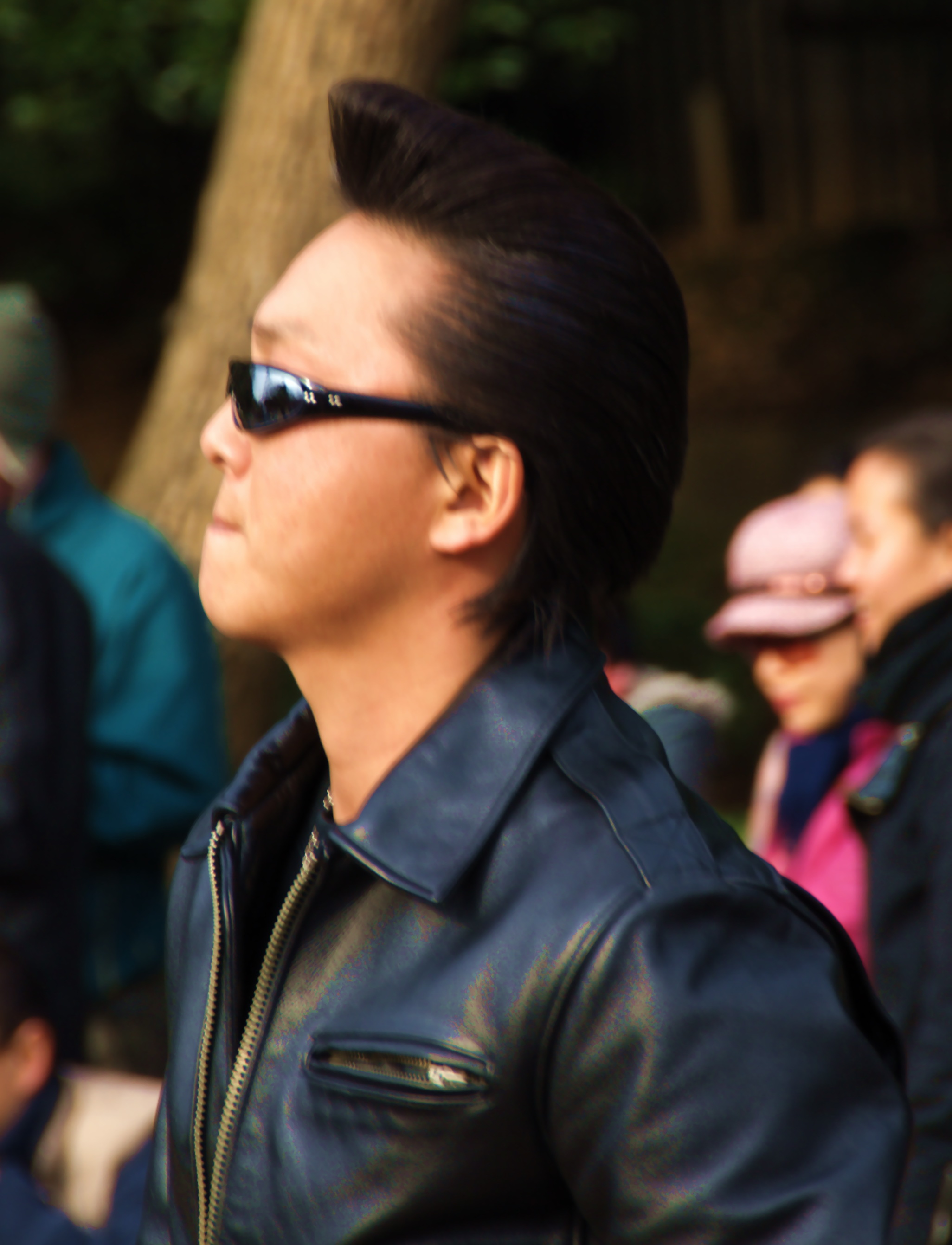
The "duck's ass" style, with a pompadour

The style requires that the hair be combed back around the sides of the head. The teeth edge of a comb is then used to define a central parting running from the crown to the nape at the back of the head, resembling the rear end of a duck. The hair on the top front of the head is either deliberately disarrayed so that untidy strands hang down over the forehead, or combed up and then curled down into an 'elephant's trunk' which hangs down as far as the top of the nose. The sides are styled to resemble the folded wings of the duck.

A variant of the style, the Detroit, consists of the long back and sides combined with a flattop. There is also a version involving a much shorter flat-top with long back and sides known as the Flat-Top Boogie or Flat-Top with Fenders. In California, the top hair was allowed to grow longer and combed into a wavelike pompadour shape known as a "breaker".

The ducktail hair style contributed to the term greasers: to accomplish this look, much pomade (hair grease) is required to hold the hair in place. Hair creams, still popularly used in the 1950s, only required an increase in the amount to make hair remain in the desired style. Brands of grease used include Black & White, Sweet Georgia Brown, Royal Crown, and Murrays. On the West Coast of the US, pomades such as Dixie Peach or Brylcreem and tonics such as Wildroot Cream-Oil were popular.

To ensure that the hair was just so, the wearer often touched up the D.A. many times during the day by running a greased comb through it. This led to a stylized means of handling the comb by drawing it out of the back pocket of a pair of jeans using the extended index and middle finger, and, holding it thus, running the comb through the two side "wings" of the style to adjust their shape.

== Significance ==
The D.A. quickly became a stereotypical feature of rebels, mobsters, and nonconformists, and gained popularity especially after the rise of rock 'n roll singer Elvis Presley, who sported the same look. Although the ducktail was adopted by Hollywood to represent the wild youth of the 1950s, only a minority of males actually sported a D.A., even amongst the British rockers and Teddy Boys of the same era. The style became popular in India after film star Shammi Kapoor sported it. It is also associated with men of Mediterranean, Eastern European and/or Latin American descent, though in slightly different styles.

== Variations ==
The ducktail hairstyle in African-American culture is a patch of hair on the nape of the neck that is grown out. Several African-American athletes have worn this version of the ducktail, such as basketball player Drew Gooden, baseball player Coco Crisp, and football player Von Miller. Other notable African-Americans with the hairstyle, similar to the rattail, include rapper The Game.

== See also ==
- List of hairstyles
