= Flattop =

Hairstyle

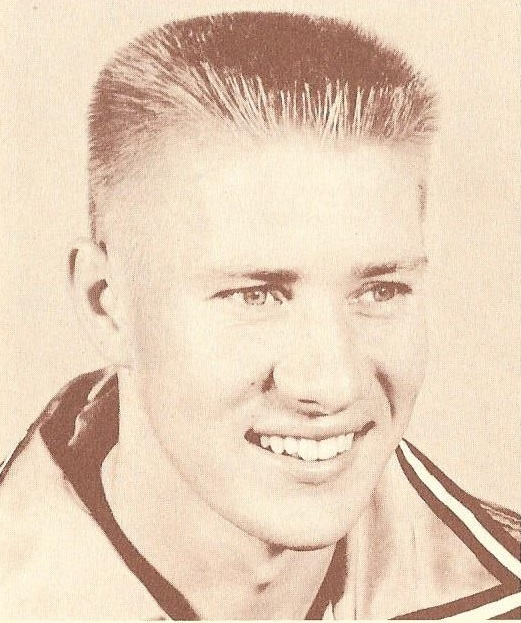
American basketball player Gary Thompson sporting a flattop haircut, c. 1958

A flattop is a classic hairstyle characterized by short hair on the sides and back of the head, with the top hair cut short and styled to stand upright in a flat, level plane.

== Styling ==
In the most classic style of flattop for men and boys, the hair on top of the head is styled upright and cut flat from front to back before rounding over the crown at the back of the head. The shortest hair on top, which is at the highest point on the head, is cut to about a quarter of an inch long, resulting in hair at the front being about 3/4 to 1-1/4 inches, depending on the roundness of the head. The back and sides are cut to about a quarter of an inch (usually the same length or slightly shorter than the length of the shortest hair on top) and tapered into the upright hair. The ears are cleanly outlined and the sideburns are squared just above the orifice of the ear. The neckline is cut with a low taper.

Other versions popular in counter-culture are left longer on the top and often taper upwards from crown to a length of two to three inches in the front, or with a modified back and sides which are alternatively left long or shaved to the skin. A variant form known by names including "flattop with fenders" and "flat top boogie" has long sides known as fenders, which are styled and slicked-back into a ducktail. Another version, often worn by soldiers in the U.S. military, shaves the hair to the skin from the highest point on the back of the crown all the way down the back and sides with lather and razor, leaving only enough hair on top for the shortest of flattops, resulting in the hair on top resembling a horseshoe shape on top. This is known as a "horseshoe flattop" or "shoe". Regardless of the form, the flattop is usually cut with electric clippers, using both the clipper-over-comb and freehand techniques on the top and detachable blades on the back and sides.

Flattops are typically groomed with wax pomade (known as butch wax in the 1950s), hair spray, mousse, gel, or cream—depending upon hair texture and the preference of the wearer regarding stiffness and shine of the upright hair. Some with especially coarse hair textures do not require product to maintain their hold, though most must style their flattop with a blow dryer and styling product of choice. Since the hair is cut very short and quickly grows out of its precise shape, maintenance haircuts are required at every two to three weeks, and some flattop wearers visit their barber weekly—and often on Fridays, resulting in a phenomenon barbers call "Flattop Friday".

When a flattop haircut is viewed from the front, varying degrees of squarish appearance are achieved by the design of the upper sides as they connect to the flat deck. Possibilities are somewhat limited by skull shape, density of the hair, and diameter of the individual shafts of hair, but may include: boxy upper sides with rounded corners; boxy upper sides with sharp corners; rounded upper sides with rounded corners; and rounded upper sides with sharp corners. Natural skull shape and certain deck inclinations and heights often leave an area at the center top of the head where the scalp is visible through the hair. This area is called a "landing strip", a metaphor for the landing strip on the deck of a flattop (aircraft carrier). Some flattops are designed to cause a landing strip to show to varying degrees. Whether or not the wearer wishes to have a landing strip is a typical discussion point when getting a flattop. While most all of a flattop is cut with clippers, master barbers with an attention to detail use shears at the end of the haircut to confirm that no stray hairs remain on top, which is known as giving the patron a “scissor salute”.

The flattop was popular in the early and mid 20th century, and maintains a contingent of dedicated wearers today. It is considered a classic male short hairstyle.

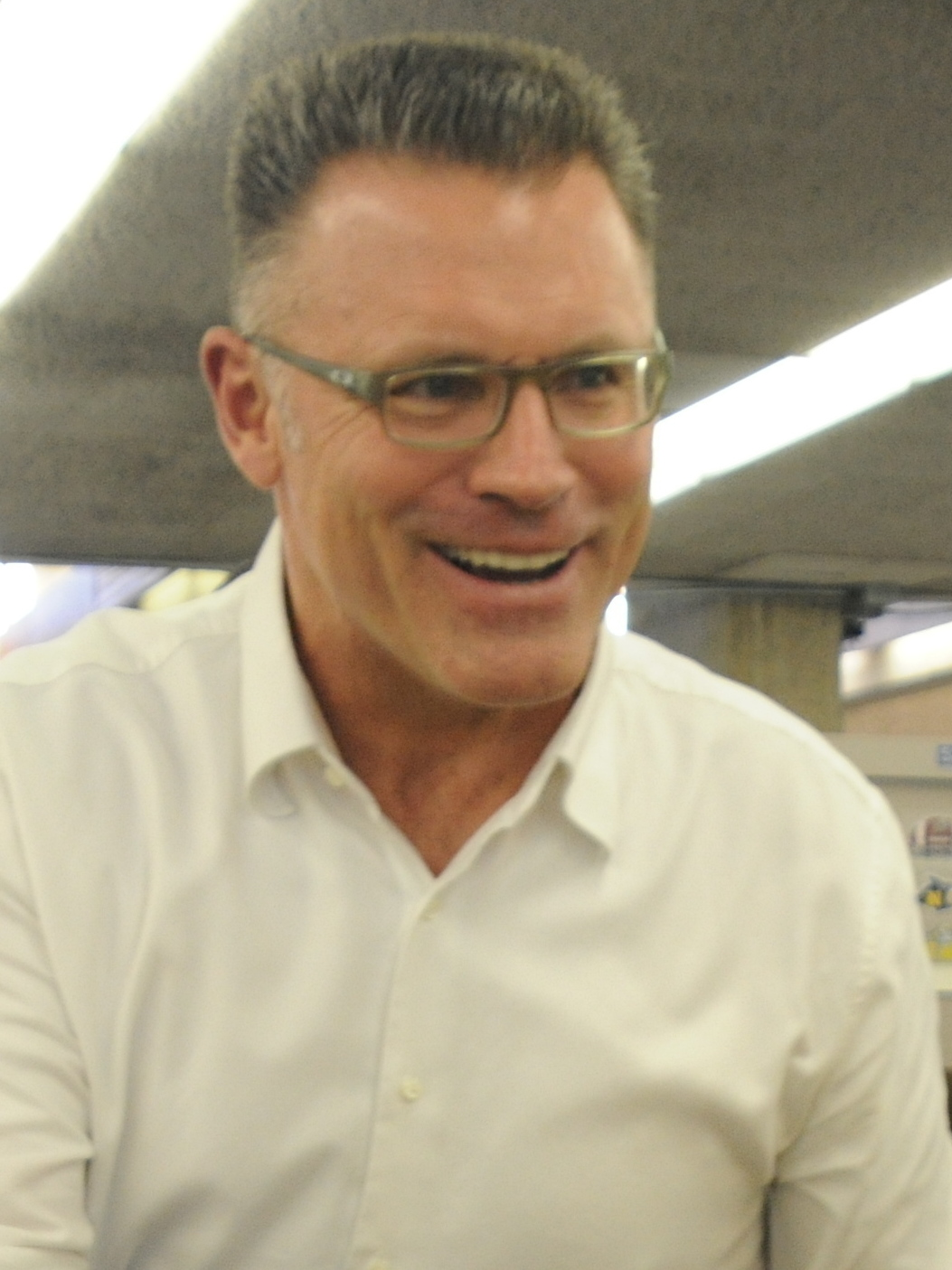
Football player and analyst Howie Long, c. 2015

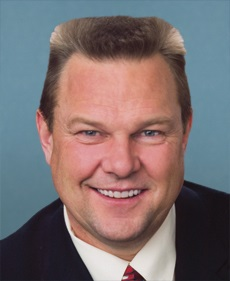
US Senator Jon Tester, c. 2013

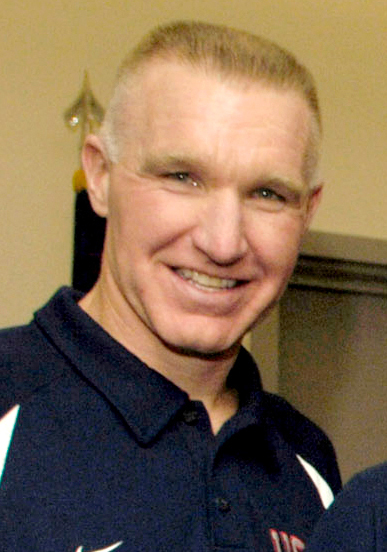
Basketball player Chris Mullin, c. 2006

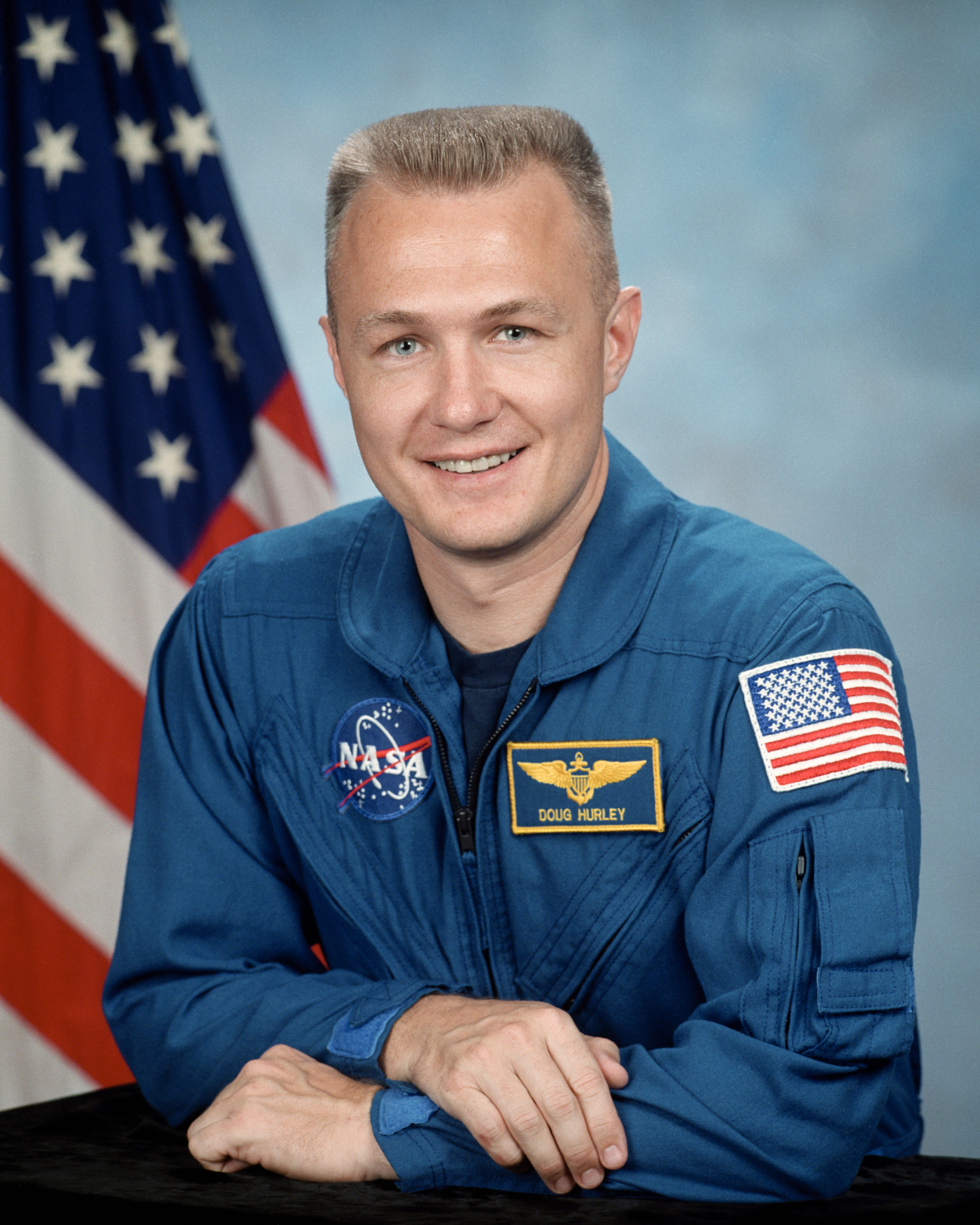
NASA astronaut Douglas G. Hurley, c. 2000

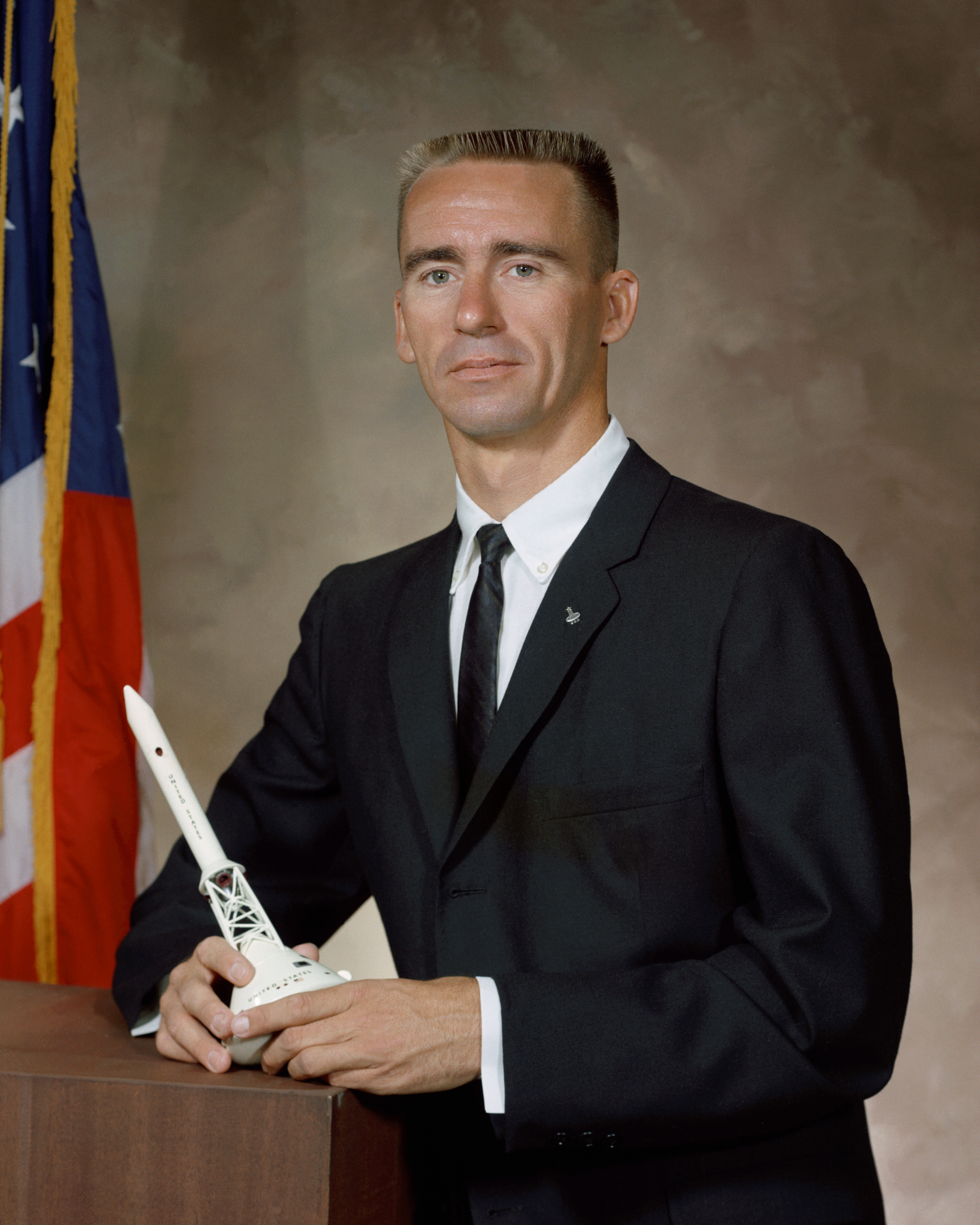
NASA astronaut Walter Cunningham, c. 1964

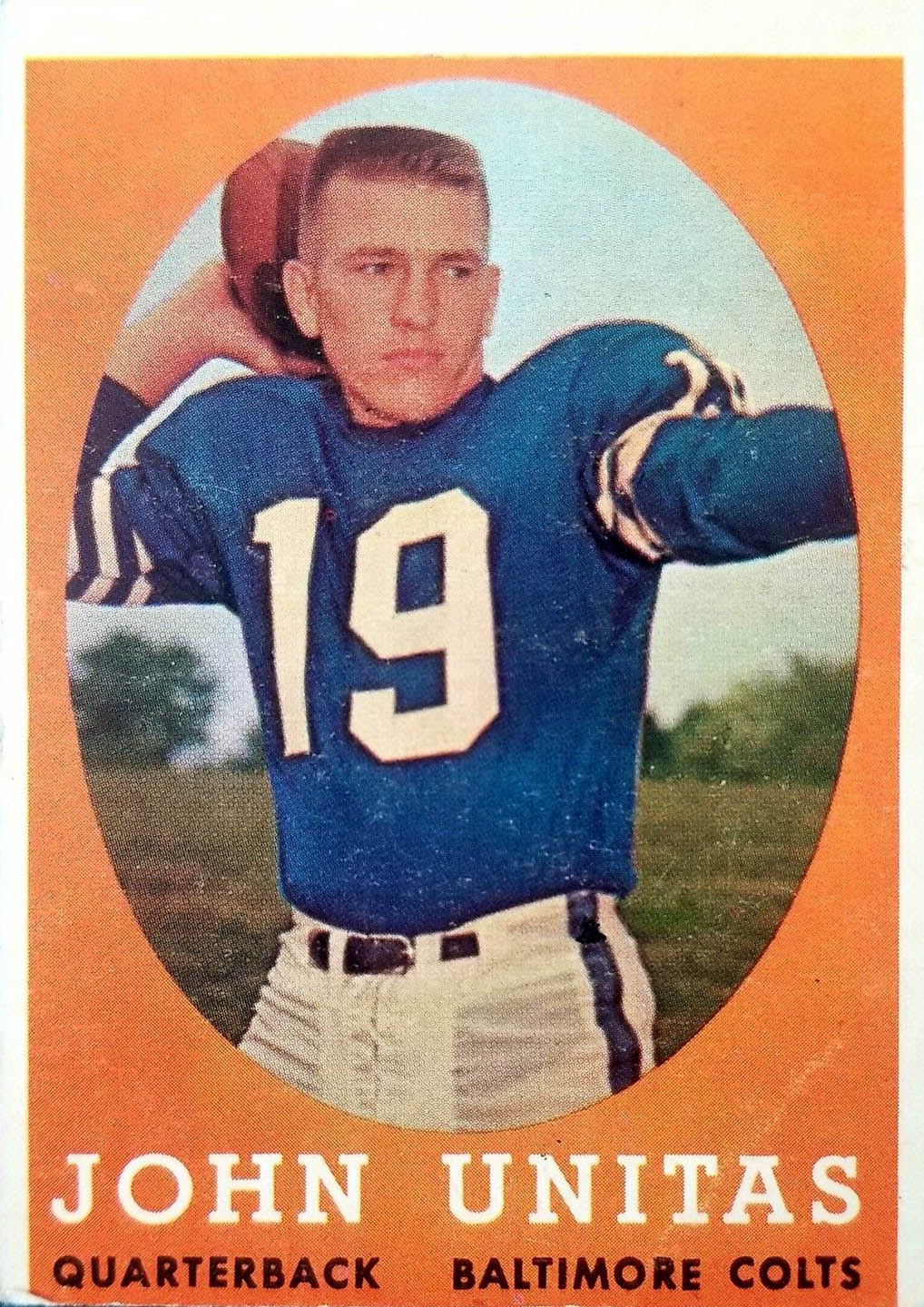
Football player Johnny Unitas, c. 1958

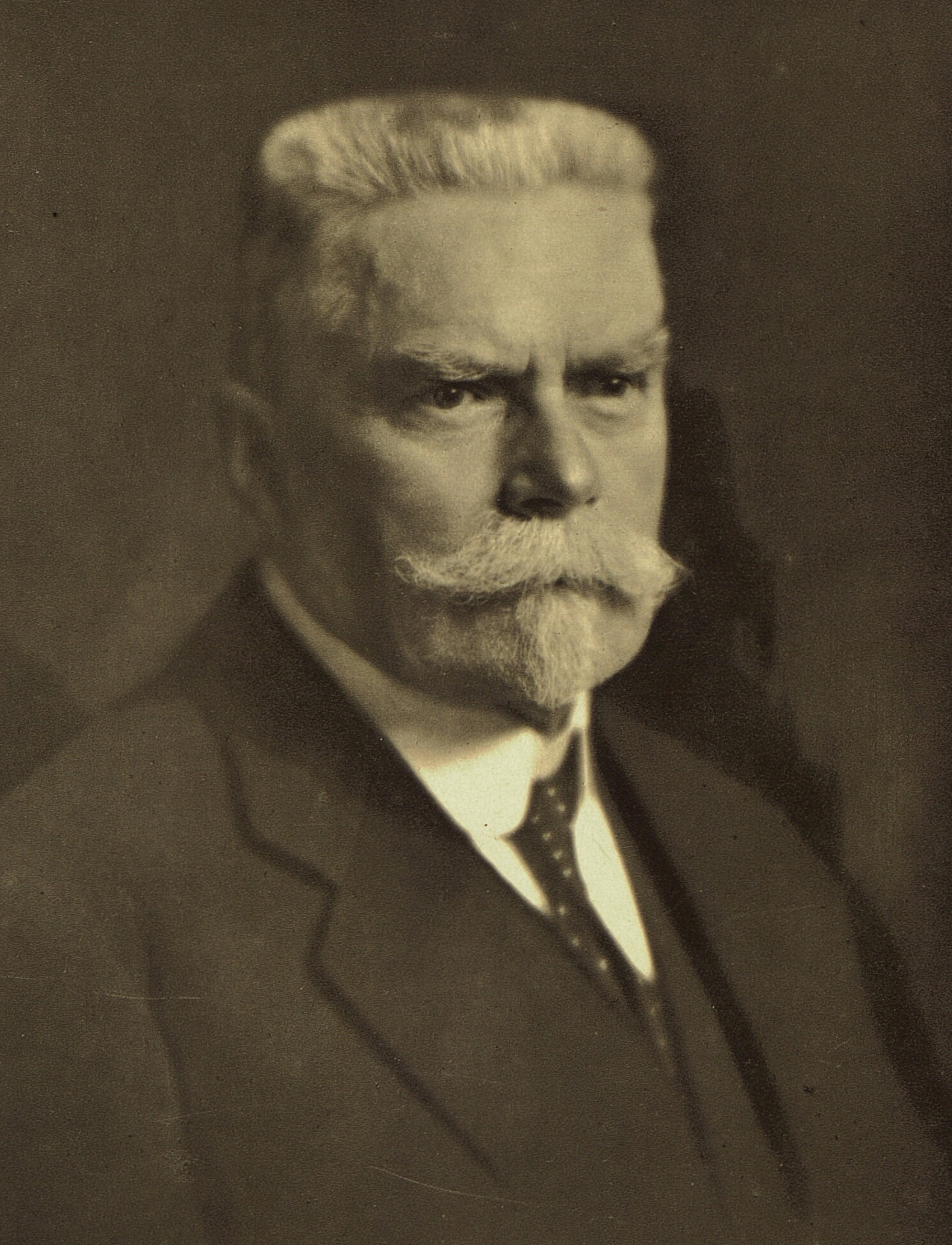
Former Prime Minister of Czechoslovakia, Karel Kramář, c. 1920

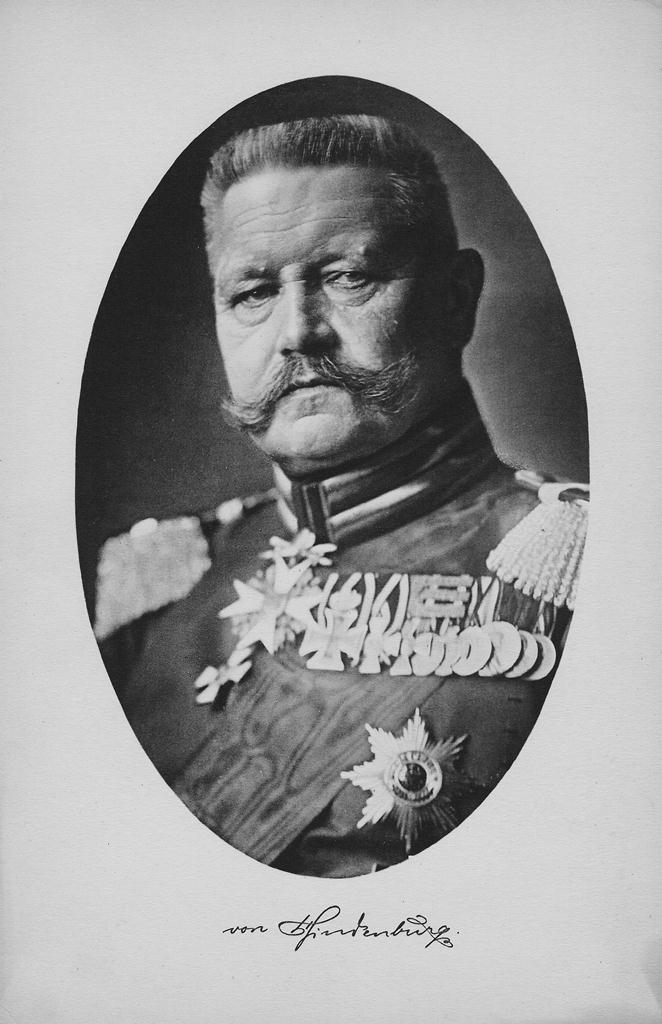
German general Paul von Hindenburg, c. 1914

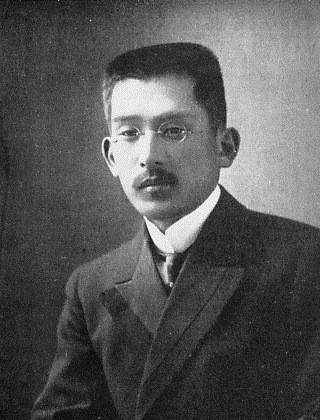
Atsumaro Yabu, c. 1913

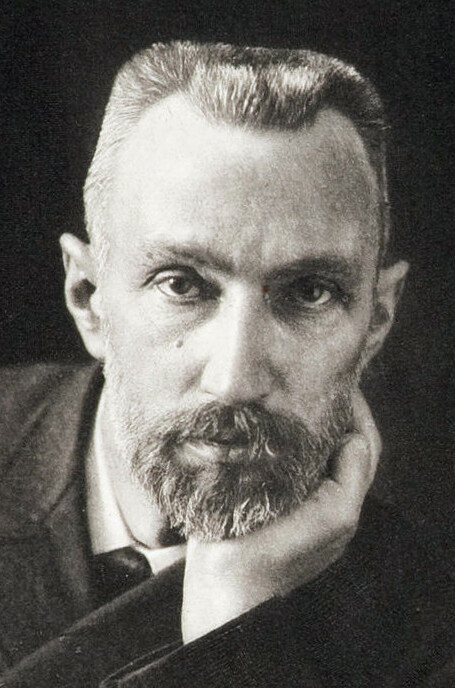
French physicist Pierre Curie, c. 1906

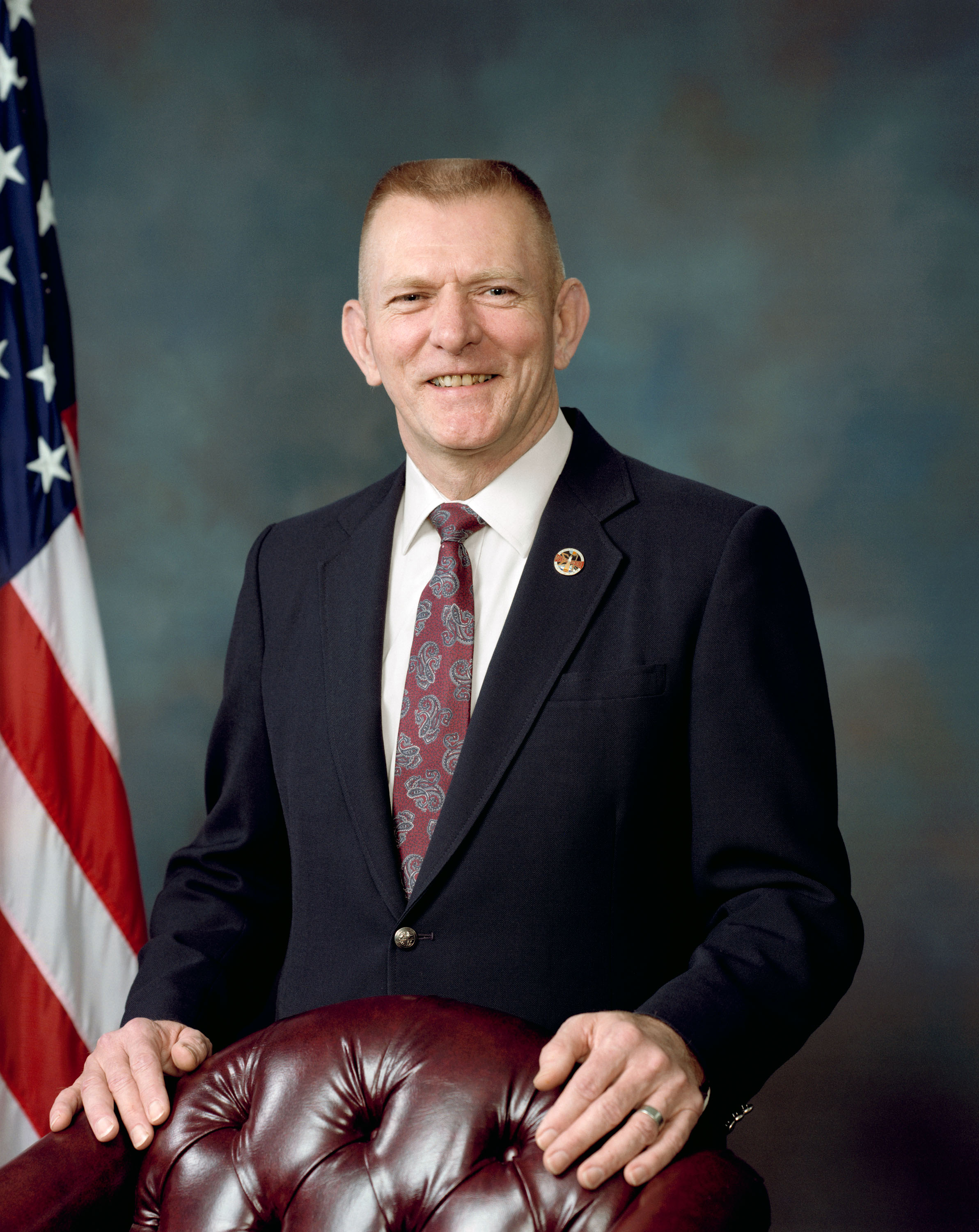
NASA Chief Flight Director Gene Kranz, c. 2007

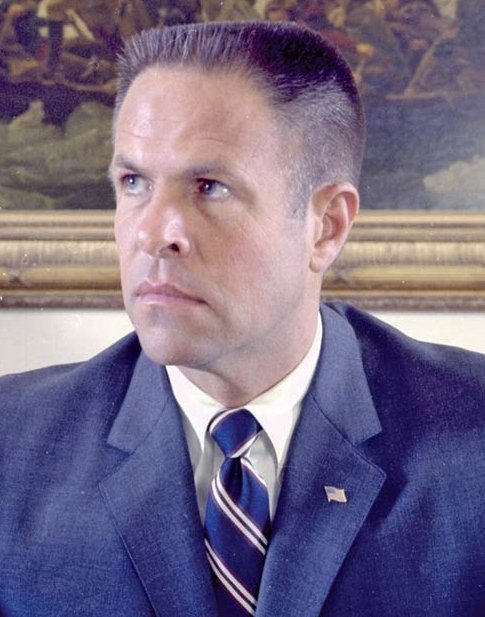
H.R. Haldeman, 1971

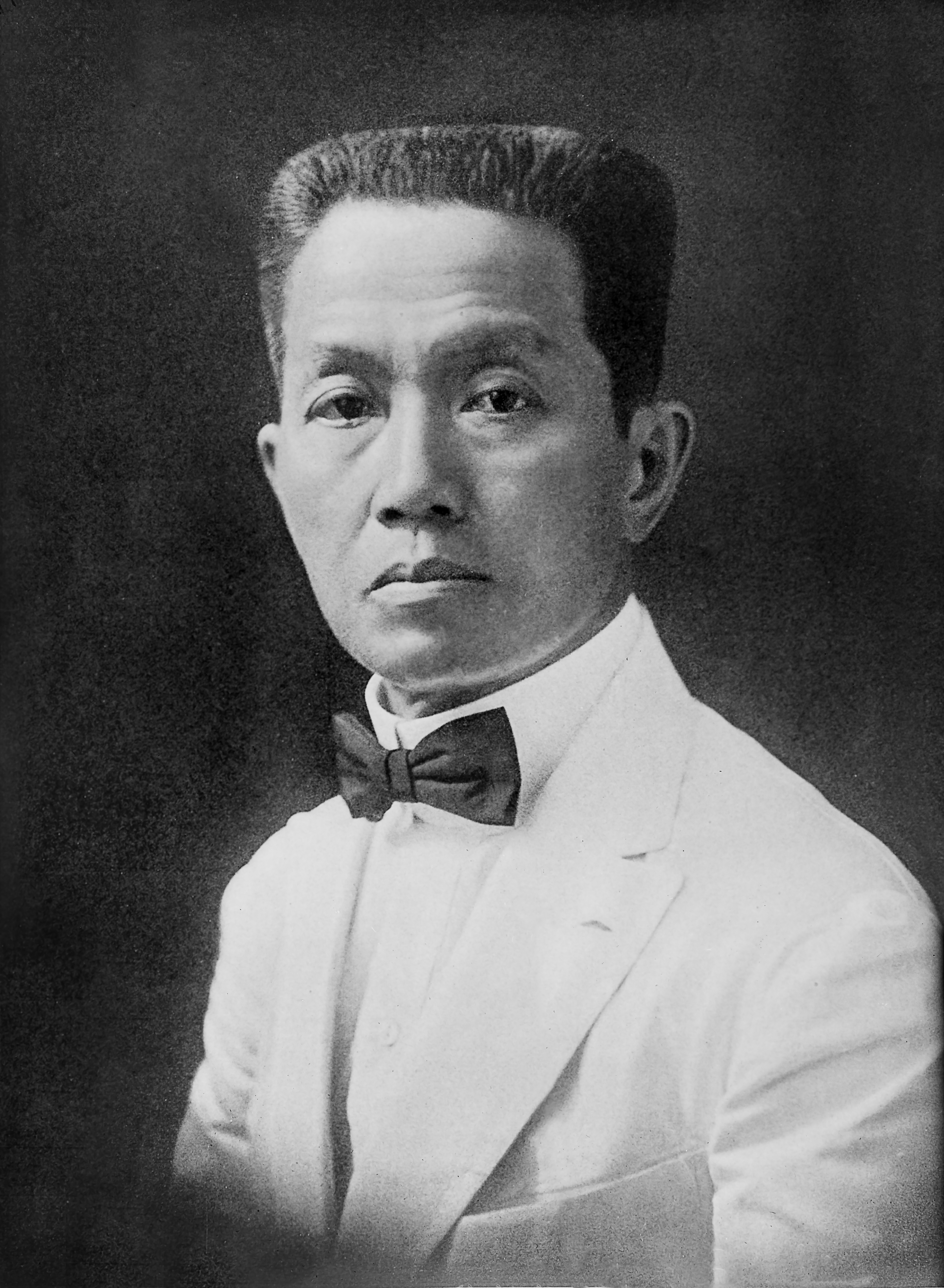
Emilio Aguinaldo, 1919

== Haircutting methods ==
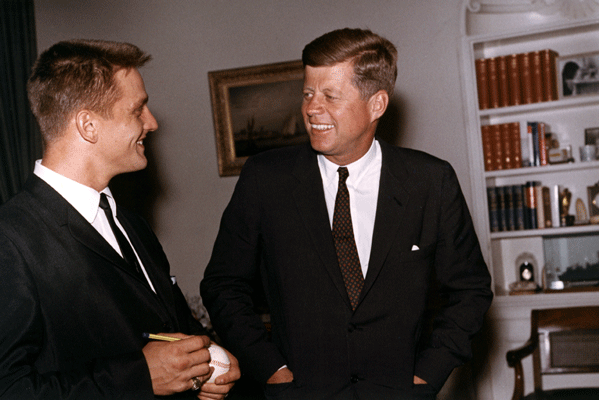
Left: Roger Maris, flattop. Right: U.S. President John F. Kennedy, Ivy League–type haircut

The hair on the lower two-thirds of the sides and back of the head are cut using the direct contact clipper method, with a 1/4 inch or shorter attached guard or detachable blade. Care must be taken to "box in" the flattop using the clipper-over-comb method on the upper third of the sides rather than contour it to the head. This is accomplished by holding a vertically-oriented comb directly to the side of the head and running the clippers upwards on the comb. On the back, the hair is typically more contoured to the crown. The top hair is typically cut with clippers utilizing the clipper-over-comb technique, though it can also be cut shears-over-comb. When the top hair is well-styled, often referred to by barbers as "trained", the top can be cut freehand with a clipper to best adjust the shape of the flattened top to the shape of the head or preference of the wearer. Some barbers utilize a large 4-inch wide comb designed for cutting flattops, while others use wide rotary clipper blades specifically designed for freehand cutting the top of a flattop.

== See also ==
- Brush cut
- Buzz cut
- Crew cut
- High and tight
- Hi-top fade
- Ivy League
- List of hairstyles

== General and cited references ==
- Thorpe, S.C. (1967). Practice and Science of Standard Barbering. Milady Publishing Corporation.
- Trusty, L. Sherman (1971). The Art and Science of Barbering. Wolfer Printing Co.
