= Bandoline (hair product) =

Liquid hair product

Bandoline is a liquid hair product used to set curls. It can be made of the mucilage of a number of natural substances, such as quince seeds, flax seeds, moss, or gums. Bandoline was primarily used in the Victorian period and early 1900s, as well as pomade, to hold elaborate hairstyles in place and prevent frizz. The solution was applied to the hair before it was rolled into curling papers, pins, or rags and left to dry.

== Methods of making ==
Bandolines would often be made at home in the Victorian period as store-bought products could have unsafe ingredients or spoil quickly. Recipes were available in books and magazines. Perfumes, floral waters, and oils would be added for scent. Carmine could be added for color. Most methods consist of soaking the substance in water or bringing it to a boil to release its thickening agents.

When made from gum, gum arabic or gum tragacanth is used. The gum is left to dissolve in water overnight or for a few days until the mucilage forms. The mixture is then strained and perfumed. A similar method can be used to make bandoline from quince or flax seeds (sometimes called linseeds). The seeds can also be boiled in water until it has thickened.

== See also ==
- Beard oil
- Brilliantine
- Brylcreem
- Hair gel
- Hair spray
- Hair texture powder
- Macassar oil
- Pomade
