= The Crew =

The Crew may refer to:

== Film ==
- The Crew (1928 film), a French silent film directed by Maurice Tourneur
- The Crew (1935 film), a French film directed by Anatole Litvak
- The Crew (1994 film), directed by Carl Colpaert, starring Viggo Mortensen, Donal Logue, and Jeremy Sisto
- The Crew (2000 film), directed by Michael Dinner, starring Burt Reynolds
- The Crew (2008 film), a British crime film
- The Crew (2015 film), a French crime film

== Music ==
- The Crew (album), a 1984 album by 7 Seconds
- The Crew (band), a 1990 music group

== Television ==
- The Crew (1995 TV series), an American sitcom that aired on Fox
- The Crew (Australian TV series), an Australian TV series
- The Crew (2021 TV series), an American comedy television series on Netflix
- "The Crew" (The Amazing World of Gumball), an episode of The Amazing World of Gumball

== Video games ==
- The Crew, a racing video game series developed by Ubisoft Ivory Tower
  - The Crew (video game), a 2014 racing video game that went defunct in 2024
  - The Crew 2, a 2018 racing video game
  - The Crew Motorfest, a 2023 racing video game

== Other media ==
- The Crew (novel), a 1923 war novel by Joseph Kessel
- The Crew (web series), a science fiction comedy web series
- The Crew (comics), a Marvel Comic
- The Crew, a novel by Bali Rai

== Other uses ==
- The nickname for the Columbus Crew, a Major League Soccer franchise
- The Crew (card game), a cooperative trick-taking game released in 2019

== See also ==
- Crew (disambiguation)
- Krew (disambiguation)
