= Krew (disambiguation) =

Krew is a Canadian group known for their gaming videos.

Krew may also refer to:

- Krew (brand), an American apparel company
- KREW, a radio station in Plainview, Texas, U.S.
- Krew, a character of the Jak and Daxter series

== See also ==
- Krewe, or krew, a social organization that stages parades and/or balls for the Carnival season
- Crew (disambiguation)
- Crewe (disambiguation)
- The Crew (disambiguation)
