= Pomade =

Hairstyling product

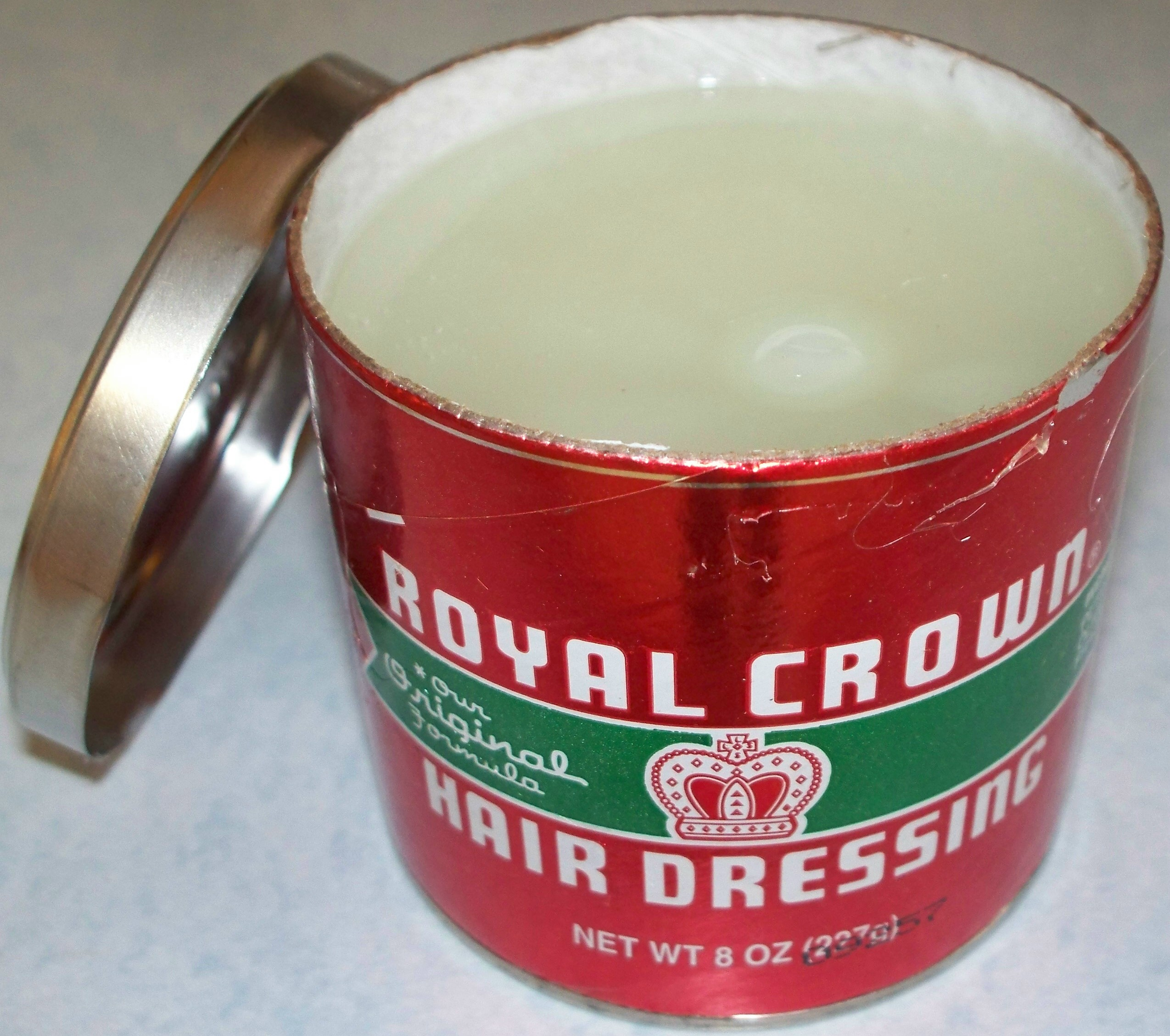
A tin of Royal Crown Hair Dressing

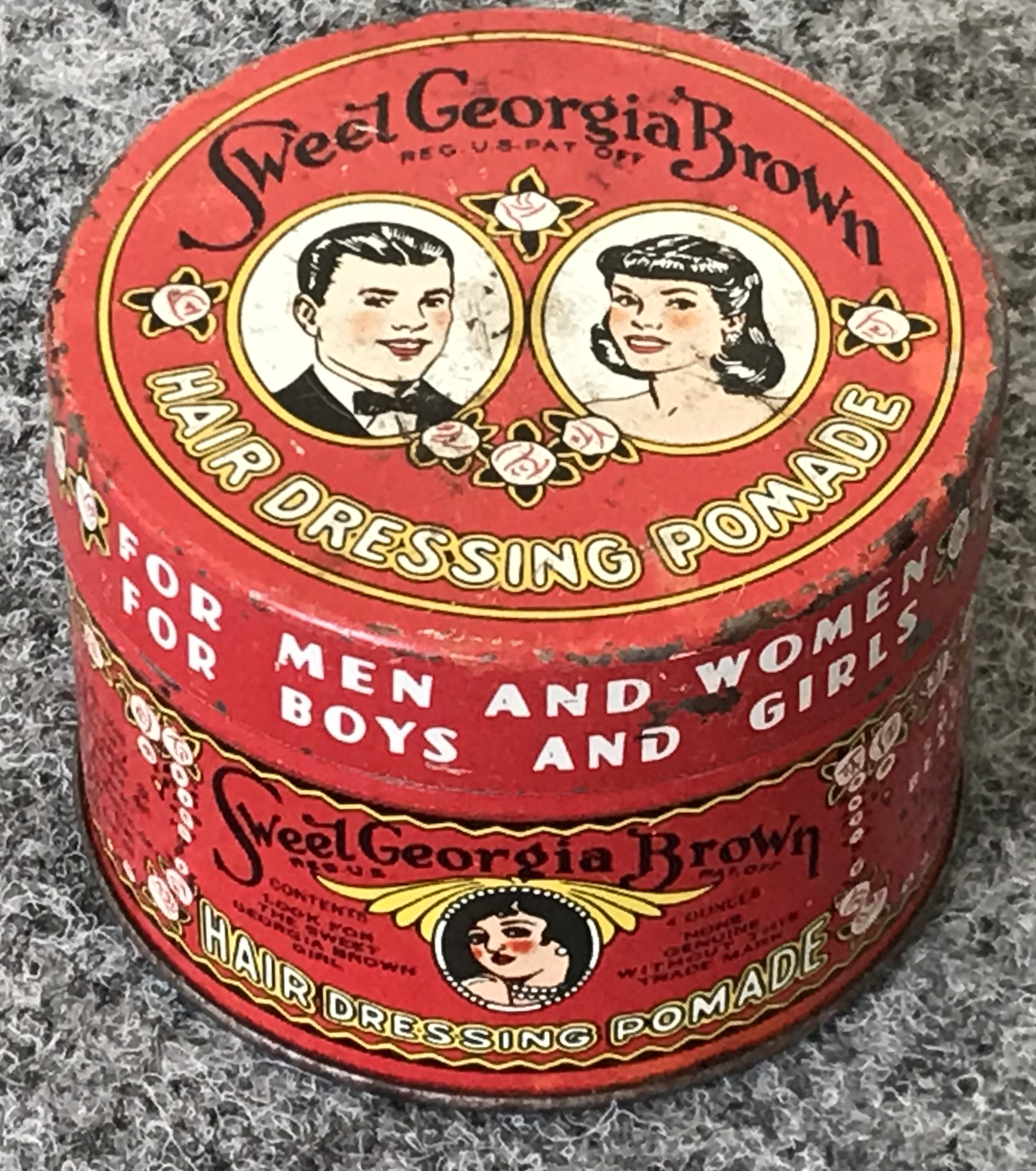
Sweet Georgia Brown Hair Dressing Pomade from 1947

Pomade is a greasy, waxy, or water-based substance that is used to style hair. It generally gives the user's hair a shiny, slick appearance. It lasts longer than most hair-care products, and often requires repeated washes for complete removal. The pomades of the 18th and 19th centuries consisted mainly of bear fat or lard. Lanolin, beeswax and petroleum jelly have been used extensively in modern pomades. The hold of pomades makes sculptured hairstyles such as the pompadour waves (hairstyle) possible.

== Fragrances ==
Pomade also refers to a wax extract of fragrant flowers. They preserve the fragrances. Instead of using hot wax as the extractant, fats such as tallow have been used. Related to pomades are other forms of extracting and preserving fragrances. These include concretes and resinoids.

== Names ==
The English word pomade derives from French pommade, itself from Italian pomata, from pomo ("apple") and -ata, used to form related nouns. In the Early Modern Period, pomades were ointments made from various kinds of fat and used to beautify both the skin and face. Mashed apples were added to help perfume the mixture. (The word was also infrequently used as a synonym for apple cider.) Modern pomades may contain fragrances but are usually not particularly fruity. Other English names for the ointment, drink, and hair treatment are pomate and pomatum from pomatum, the Medieval Latin form of the same name.

== History ==
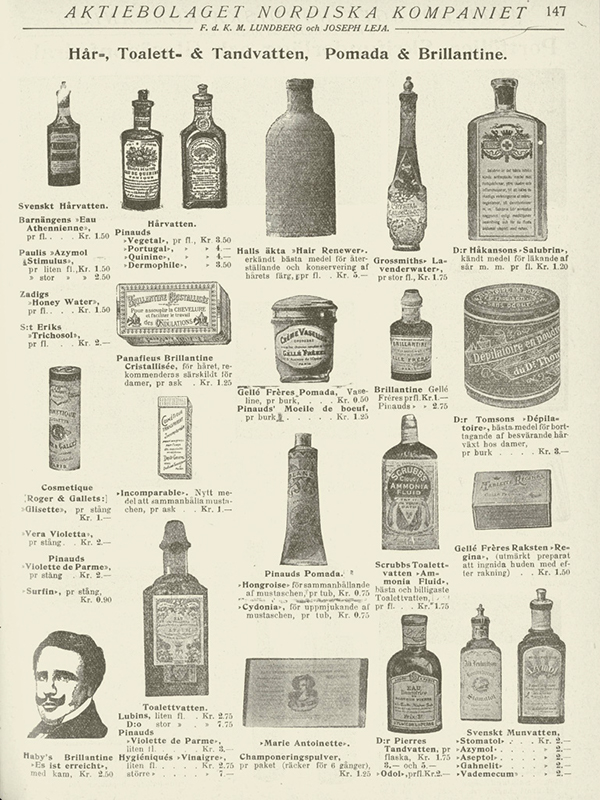
Swedish ad for toiletries, 1905/1906.

During the Roman era, soap was used as a pomade by some European tribes. In the 19th century, bear fat was usually the main pomade ingredient. In 1873 UK company Morgan's Pomade was established selling Hair Darkening Pomade across the world. By the early 20th century, petroleum jelly, beeswax, and lard were more commonly used. Early 20th century examples of pomades include Murray's Superior Pomade (originating in 1925), Sweet Georgia Brown Hair Dressing Pomade (originating in 1934) and Royal Crown Pomade (originating in 1936). Dixie Peach Hair Pomade was popular with teenage boys in the US from World War II through the 1960s.

The concept of pomade can be traced back to ancient times. The ancient Egyptians, for instance, used a substance similar to pomade made from animal fats and other ingredients to style their hair and wigs. This practice was not only about appearance but also about hygiene and protection from the harsh sun.

Pomades were much more popular in the 1920s to 1950s than they are today, although they have made a comeback in the 2010s with recent alternations to the marketplace, which feature not only traditionally manufactured petroleum and oil-based pomades but also modern water-soluble pomades. Compared to oil-based pomades, water-based pomades wash out more easily.

Hairstyles from the 20th and 21st centuries involving the use of pomade include the ducktail, pompadour, and quiff. The Pompadour was a cultural phenomenon from the mid-1950s to 1964 and was worn by young actors and those in the new musical genre, Rock and Roll, until it fell out of favour with the advent of the Beatles. Examples can be seen on Elvis Presley, Chuck Berry and James Dean. In the 1980s, Rockabilly style Rock and Roll and the pompadour had a resurgence and was worn by musicians such as Brian Setzer and Chris Isaak.

== Modern resurgence ==
The reemergence of popular pomade use coincides with the rise in popularity of the disconnected undercut hairstyle. The hairstyle is characterized by buzzed or faded sides, and a much longer top which is disconnected from the side hairs. The undercut hairstyle was first popularized in the early 20th century as affordable barbershops used the newly invented hair clipper to quickly and cheaply shave the sides of men's heads; leaving long top hairs that would be styled with pomade. During the 2010s, the style was featured in many popular period movies, especially World War II films, and in shows such as Peaky Blinders. Celebrities such as athlete David Beckham and actor Brad Pitt were seen donning this style of hair.

The heavy hold of pomade is very well suited to control the long hair of most undercut styles.

Today's pomades fall under two main categories with some subcategories, the traditional oil-based pomade and the newer water-based and gel pomades.

Traditional oil-based pomades are generally subdivided into three more groups: heavy hold, medium hold, and light hold. Heavier pomades generally have a higher wax content and better hold their shape throughout the day. The higher wax content usually results in a lower shine pomade. Light holds, sometimes called a brilliantine, have a higher oil content and therefore are usually more shiny. This type of pomade has a wet look and a lower hold. Some prominent modern oil-based pomades are Reuzel, Lockhart's, and Murray's.

The water-based pomades are split between gel-based pomades (Orthodox) and water-based (Unorthodox) pomades. Gel pomades come in different degrees of hold. Firm hold pomades dry much more stiff and are better at holding a particular style. However, they are generally less malleable and can only be restyled during the day by wetting the hair. These pomades generally contain hardening agents such as polyvinyl pyrolidone or vinyl pyrolidone. Some popular gel pomades include Suavecito, Layrite and Imperial.

Unorthodox water-based pomades mimic the malleable qualities of oil-based pomades while still being able to be easily washed out like a gel pomade. Popular unorthodox water-based pomades include O'Douds, Shear Revival, Lockharts, and Flagship pomades.

== Natural versus traditional pomades ==
The modern preference for natural hair care solutions has given rise to a reevaluation of traditional pomade formulations. While the word "pomade" has historically been associated with a variety of hair styling products, there has been a notable shift away from products containing petroleum. This movement has been driven by an increasing awareness of the problems associated with petroleum-based hair products and a growing demand for natural hair care alternatives that are both safe and effective for users.

Traditional pomades, often petroleum-based, have been found to possess certain qualities that can be detrimental to the hair and scalp health of consumers. A primary issue lies in their tendency to cause buildup, leading to clogged hair follicles, which can impede hair growth and result in scalp ailments. Furthermore, the presence of certain petroleum derivatives has raised concerns over their potential health risks, including the risk of irritation and more serious consequences from prolonged use.

In contrast, natural pomades are typically made from a blend of ingredients like shea butter, beeswax, and a variety of nourishing oils. These ingredients offer a stark difference in both intention and effect, aiming to provide nutrients and support for the hair and scalp, instead of merely offering styling hold. The benefits of natural ingredients over petroleum extend beyond avoiding negative side effects—they often contribute positively to the overall condition of the hair, promoting moisture retention and a healthy scalp environment.

The resurgence of natural hair grease reflects a broader consumer shift towards products that not only perform well but also align with a health-conscious lifestyle and ethical consumerism. As awareness and education about the benefits of natural hair care ingredients grow, so does the popularity of these safer, more beneficial alternatives in hair styling routines.

== See also ==
- Bandoline (hair product)
- Beard oil
- Brilliantine
- Brylcreem
- Hair gel
- Hair spray
- Hair texture powder
- Macassar oil
