= Lord Crewe =

Lord Crewe may refer to:

- John Crew, 1st Baron Crew (1598–1679)
- Thomas Crew, 2nd Baron Crew (1624–1697)
- Nathaniel Crew, 3rd Baron Crew (1633–1721)
- John Crewe, 1st Baron Crewe (1742–1829)
- John Crewe, 2nd Baron Crewe (1772–1835)
- Hungerford Crewe, 3rd Baron Crewe (1812–1894)
- Robert Crewe-Milnes, 1st Marquess of Crewe (1858–1945)
