= William Crewe =

Medieval soldier from Cheshire

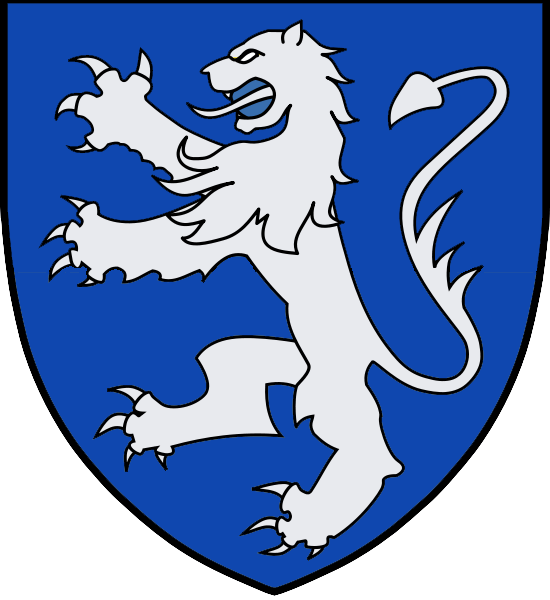
- Arms of William Crewe
- Born: c. 1360
- Died: 21 July 1403; Shrewsbury, Shropshire, England
- Family: Crewe
- Spouse: Alice Cholmondeley
- Issue: Thomas Crewe, John Crewe
- Father: David Crewe

William Crewe (c. 1360 – 21 July 1403) of Sound was an English soldier and landowner from Cheshire. He joined the Percy rebellion and was killed at the Battle of Shrewsbury in 1403.

== Early life ==
Born around 1360 and descended from the Crewes of Crewe, William was a substantial landowner within the Hundred of Nantwich and was permitted to occupy the Cheshire inheritance of his brother, Thomas, who had risen to prominence in Warwickshire as steward to the Beauchamp estates. William and his son John remained in Cheshire and were settled at Nantwich and Sound, and a later inquisition refers to lands in Aston, Grafton, Handley, and Worleston.

Crewe was an active soldier and would serve in Ireland, both in 1397 and on the expedition of 1399 for which he was rewarded with a life annunity of £5 by Richard II. Following the deposition of Richard II, Crewe joined the Scottish expedition of 1400 under his new monarch, but little came of it after Henry IV ordered a preemptive English withdrawal. Crewe, however, like many of his Cheshire contemporaries, was ultimately loyal to the late king. Earlier that year, Crewe was one of those appointed commissioners of the peace for Nantwich Hundred.

== Death ==
Cheshire remained a Ricardian stronghold after the king's deposition, and when Henry Percy arrived in the county and began recruiting for his army the Crewe family would provide at least two of the rebels from the Hundred of Nantwich. In addition to William Crewe of Sound, Percy also found support from Henry Crewe of Aston, who, alongside John, son of William, had earlier been granted livery of the crown by Richard II. Percy's army eventually numbered some 14,000 men, and they would meet the king's forces outside Shrewsbury on 21 July 1403. The battle resulted in a royalist victory, and a significant loss of life among the gentry of Cheshire. Amidst them were the Crewes, the pair being among the few Shrewsbury soldiers for whom we have a name, both seemingly having fallen on the battlefield.

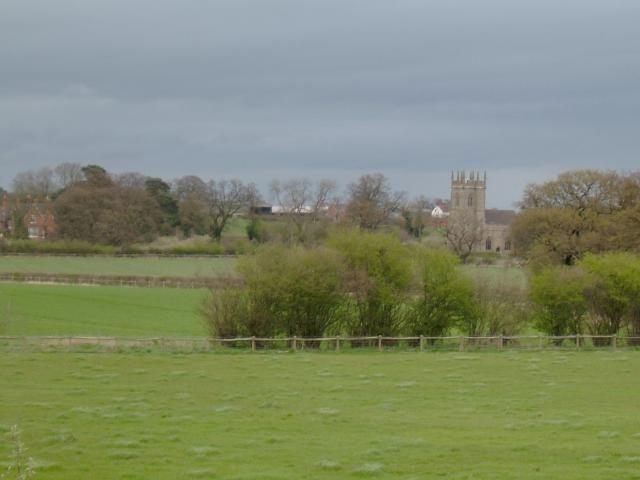
The Shrewsbury battlefield in 2005, with the church of St Mary Magdalene in the distance.

In the weeks after the battle, inquisitions post mortem were taken for both men, and their involvement in the rebellion incurred forfeitures of livestock and lands; William forfeited 21 cattle and 8 horses, as well as 32 acres of arable farmland. David Crewe of Pulcroft was one of the jurors present at William's inquisition. William was succeeded by his son, John, with whom all references to Sound disappeared, and whose son, Thomas, would settle at the salt-producing town of Nantwich.

== Family ==
William was a son of David Crewe of Sound, who died in 1401, and whose branch of the Crewe family descended from Patrick de Crewe, whose father, Sir Thomas de Crewe, was lord of the manor of Crewe in the thirteenth century. William had a brother, Thomas, who was of Wixford in Warwickshire, having left Cheshire to marry an heiress; as well as a sister, Elizabeth, who became Prioress of Chester. William married Alice, daughter of John Cholmondeley of Chorley, with whom he had two children: Thomas, who was to succeed his father and was to marry a daughter of John Legh of Bothes, but who seems to have died young; and John Crewe, who then became heir.
