= John Crewe =

John Crewe can refer to several people:

- John Crew (1603–1670), English barrister and politician
- John Crew, 1st Baron Crew (1597/8–1679), English politician and landowner; also known as John Crewe
- Sir John Crewe (Utkinton) (1641–1711), English landowner, of Utkinton Hall
- John Offley Crewe (1681–1749), English politician and landowner; originally John Offley, he changed his name to Crewe and is also known as John Crewe Offley and John Crewe-Offley
- John Crewe (the elder) (1709–1752), English politician and landowner
- John Crewe, 1st Baron Crewe (1742–1829), English politician and landowner
- John Crewe, 2nd Baron Crewe (1772–1835) English soldier and landowner
