= Crew cut =

Haircut style

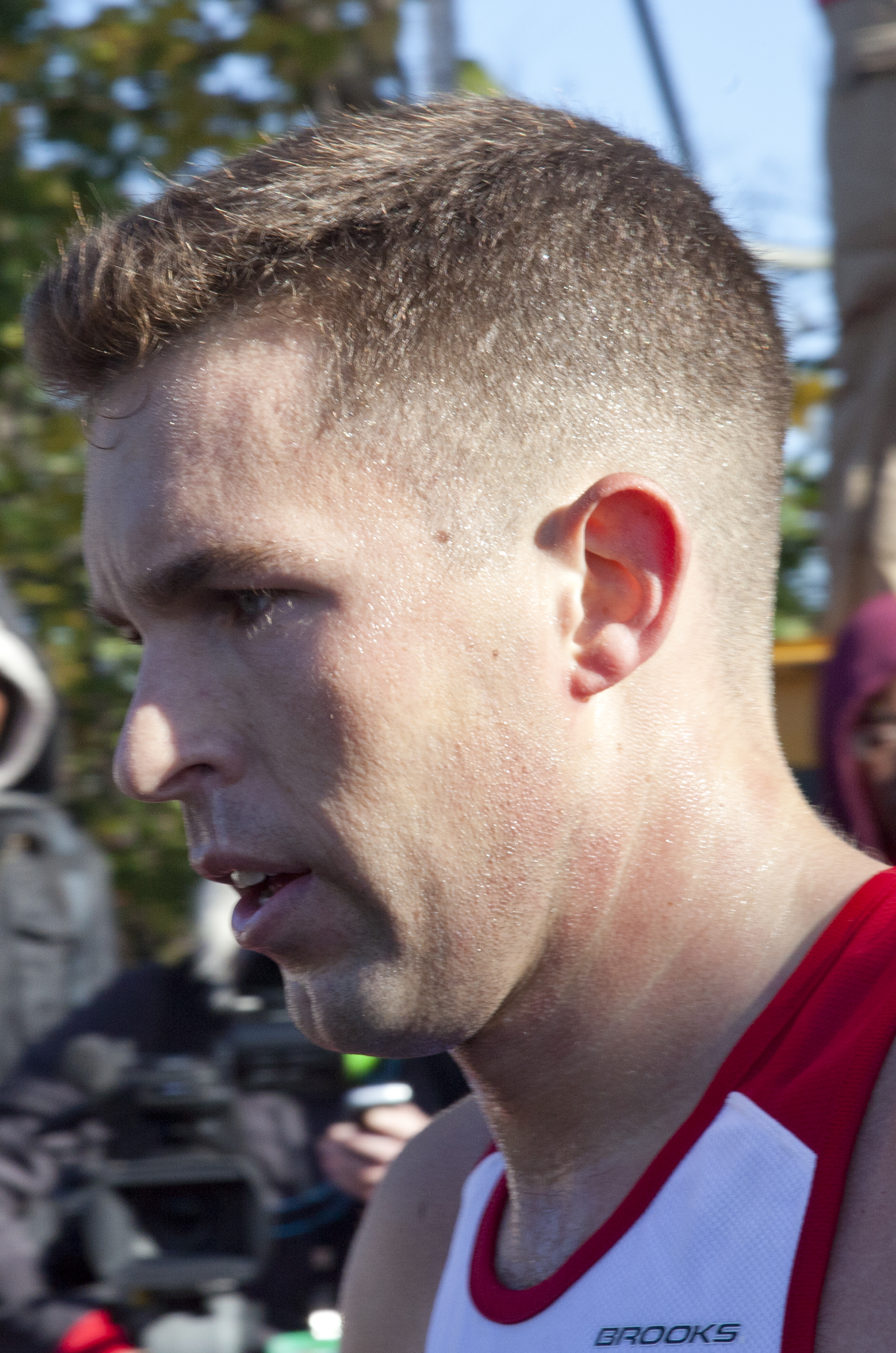
Crew-cut Marine Lieutenant, 2011. The side profile shows graduation of the top hair shorter from the front hairline to the crown.

A crew cut is a type of haircut in which the upright hair on the top of the head is cut relatively short, graduated in length from the longest hair that forms a short pomp (pompadour) at the front hairline to the shortest at the back of the crown so that in side profile, the outline of the top hair approaches the horizontal. Relative to the front view, and to varying degrees, the outline of the top hair can be arched or flattened at the short pomp front and rounded or flattened over the rest of the top to complement the front hairline, head shape, face shape and facial features. The hair on the sides and back of the head is usually tapered short, semi-short, or medium.

A short crew cut is sometimes referred to as a butch, though with the exception of variant forms, a butch differs from a crew cut in that the top hair is cut a uniform short length. A long crew cut can be referred to in the US as an ivy league crew cut or ivy league. A crew cut where the hair on the top of the head is graduated in length from the front hairline to a chosen point on the mid to back part of the crown as a flat plane, of level, upward sloping or downward sloping inclination is known as a flat top crew cut or flattop. The crew cut, flat top crew cut, butch cut and Ivy League haircut can be referred to as types of buzz cuts. These haircuts have become popular military-inspired styles for men who want a short and low-maintenance look.

== History ==
In English, the crew cut and flat top crew cut were formerly known as the pompadour or short pompadour, as well as the brush cut, and had been worn since at least the mid-18th century. The style went by other names in other languages; in French, coupe à la brosse "cut like a brush"; in German, Bürstenschnitt; in Russian, ёжик "hedgehog." A short pompadour with a flat top was considered the standard while a somewhat curved appearance across the top was suggested for wider foreheads and face shapes. The style with a flat top acquired the name brush top short pompadour and the style with a more rounded top, round top short pompadour. Prior to the invention of electric clippers with a motor in the handle in 1921 and their ensuing marketing and widespread use, barbers considered the perfect short pompadour to be the most time-consuming style to trim.

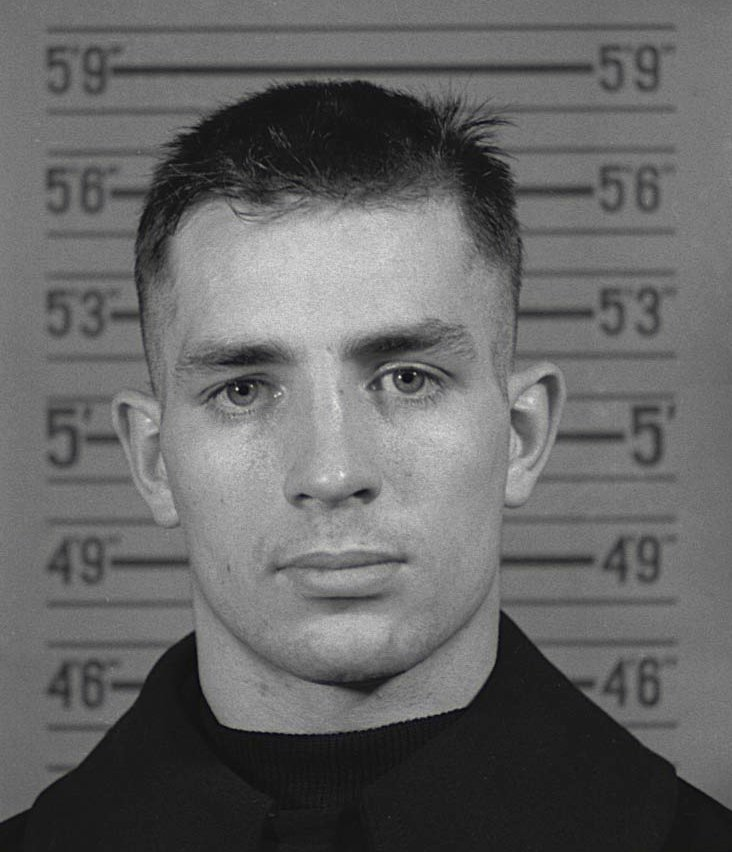
Author Jack Kerouac sporting a G.I. crew cut in 1943

The term "crew haircut" was most likely coined to describe the hairstyles worn by members of Harvard, Yale, Princeton, Cornell and other university crew teams, which were short to keep the hair from being blown into the face of the rower as the boat races down the course opposite the direction the rower is seated with both hands on the oars, making it impossible to brush the hair out of the face. The name drew a contrast to football haircuts, which had been long since 1889 when Princeton football players began wearing long hair to protect against head injury, thereby starting a trend, not altogether welcome; mop haired football players were frequently caricatured in the popular press. In 1895, the championship Yale football team appeared with "close-cropped heads" and subsequently long hair went out of style for football. Almost concurrently, the first helmets began to appear.

Crew cuts were popular in the 1920s and 1930s among college students, particularly in the Ivy League. The style was often worn as a summer haircut for its cooling effect. Men inducted into the military in World War II received G.I. haircuts, crew cuts, and a significant proportion continued to wear a crew cut while serving and after, as civilians. As long hair became popular in the mid-1960s, the crew cut and its variants waned in popularity through the 1970s. The crew cut began to come back into style in the late 1970s and early 1980s, with the flat-top crew cut being the most popular crew cut style during the 1980s.

== Styling ==
Thicker hair that wants to readily stand upright is ideal for a crew cut; with an appropriate head shape, a crew cut may be possible with fairly thin hair. When designing a crew cut, a barber follows the general sequence of other medium to short haircuts; edging, siding and topping. When designing a new crew cut and the current style is not relatively short, the hair on top or all over the head may initially be shortened with shears or clippers. Edging and siding together form a taper which usually is short, semi-short or medium. For a crew cut, some barbers perform edging and siding as one integrated process, regardless, the upper sides are initially boxed in and then cut to final form when designing the top. The hair on the top of the head can be styled clipper or shears over comb or free hand with a clipper.

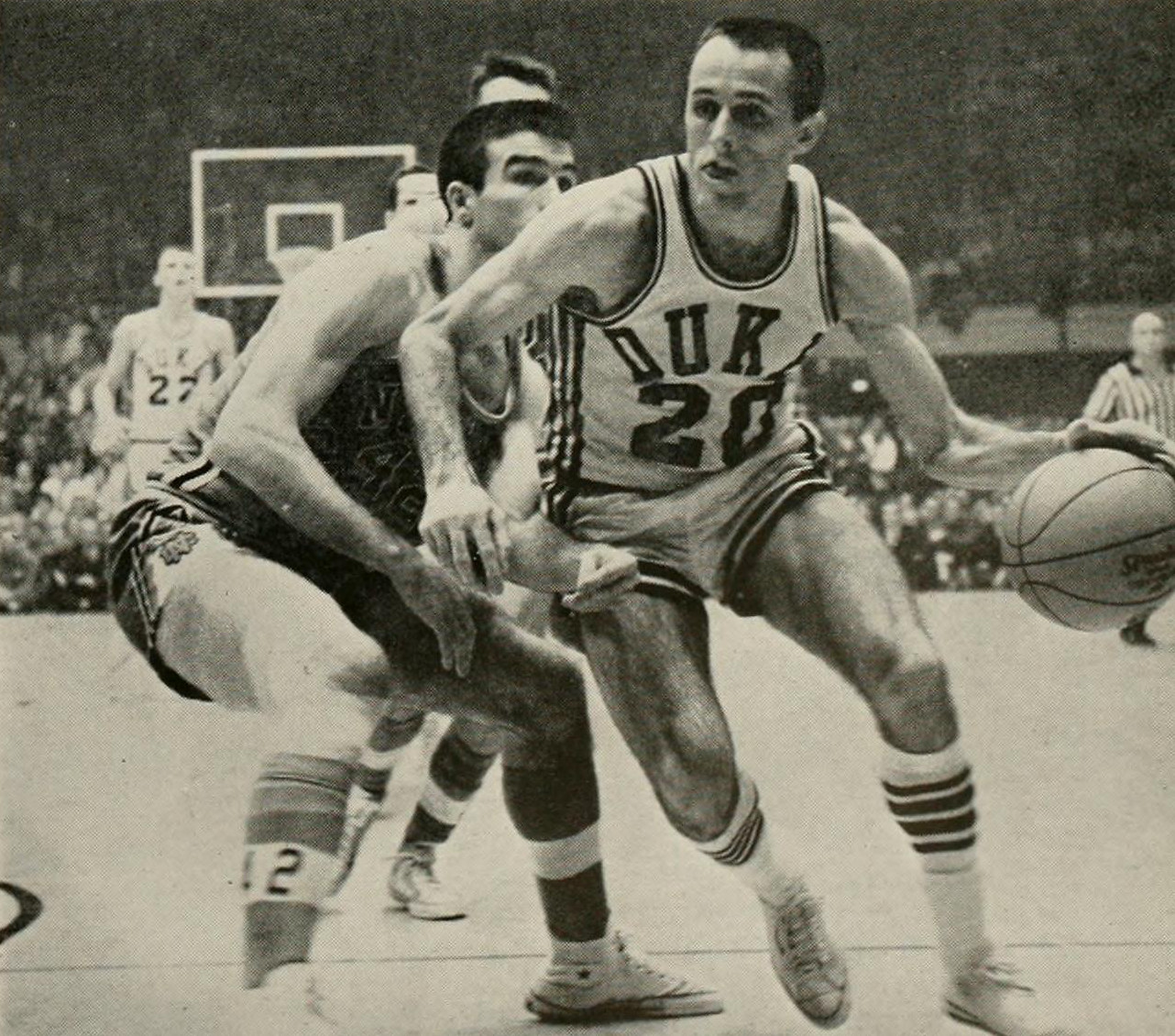
Duke player Jack Mullen (#20), depicted with a crew cut designed for a widow's peak receded hairline while playing basketball

With the clipper or shears over comb method, the comb is inserted in the upright hair at the desired length and the hair is reduced to this length by means of clippers or shears severing the hair above the teeth of the comb. Freehand means the clipper blade or guard does not determine the cut hair length but rather the distance the cutting blade is held above the scalp sets the cut length.

The barber selects the most complementary final form for the top according to face shape, skull shape, frontal hairline, and facial features within parameters set by customer instructions. Specifically, the short pompadour front can be made higher or lower, wider or narrower and can be flattened or arched to varying degrees across the forehead; the hair over the rest of the top can be more rounded or flattened; the upper sides can have more or less volume. In side profile, the outward appearance of the upright top hair should approach the horizontal; if the hair is cut so the upright top hair appears horizontal when the head is viewed from the front as well as the side, as a flat plane, the style is generally referred to as a flat-top crew cut or flat top; per customer wishes and the shape of the skull and frontal hairline, the flat plane can be level, upward or downward sloping relative to the forehead.

A crew cut with a longer top can be referred to in the US as an ivy league crew cut or ivy league. A long crew cut might be graduated in length on the top of the head from 1 1/2 inches (38 mm) at the front hairline to 1/2 inch (13 mm) at the back of the crown. A crew cut with a shorter top might have a similar proportional graduated difference in the length of the hair on the top of the head. If a short crew cut is 3/4 inch (19 mm) at the front hairline, the length of the hair at the back of the crown might be 1/4 inch (6.4 mm).

== Crew cut gallery ==
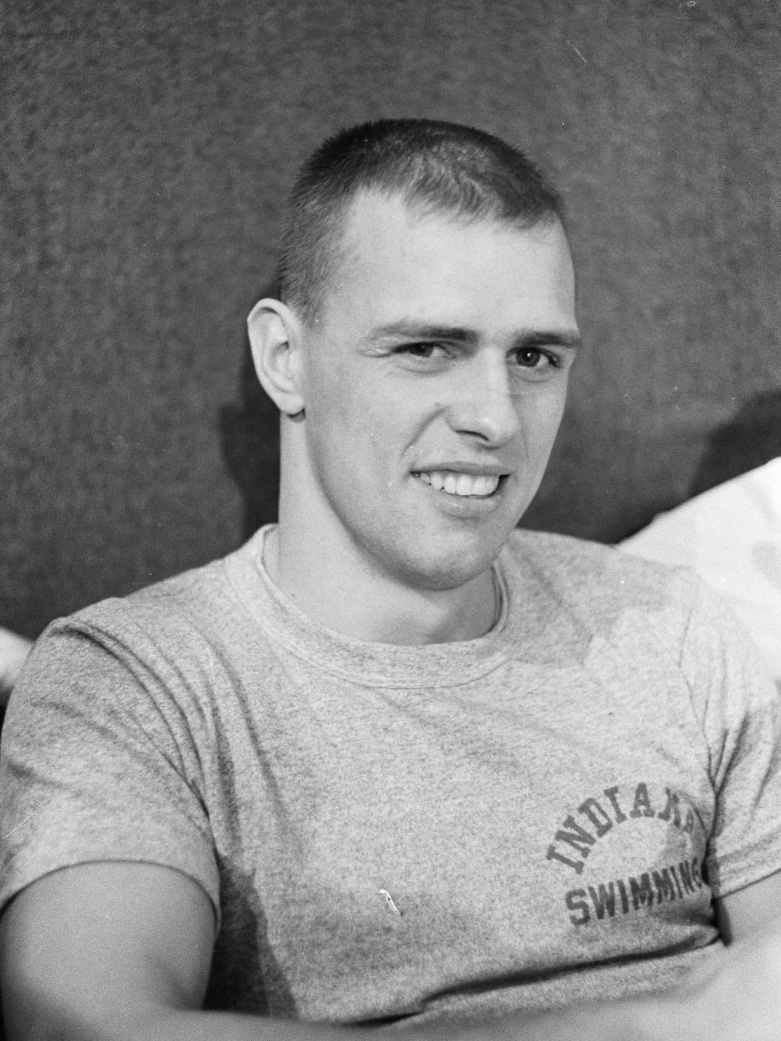
Crew cut: top, short; back/sides, semi-short taper; sideburns, short; short pomp (pompadour) front, flattened; mid top, flattened; crown, rounded; front hairline, average; wavy hair. Chet Jastremski in 1963.

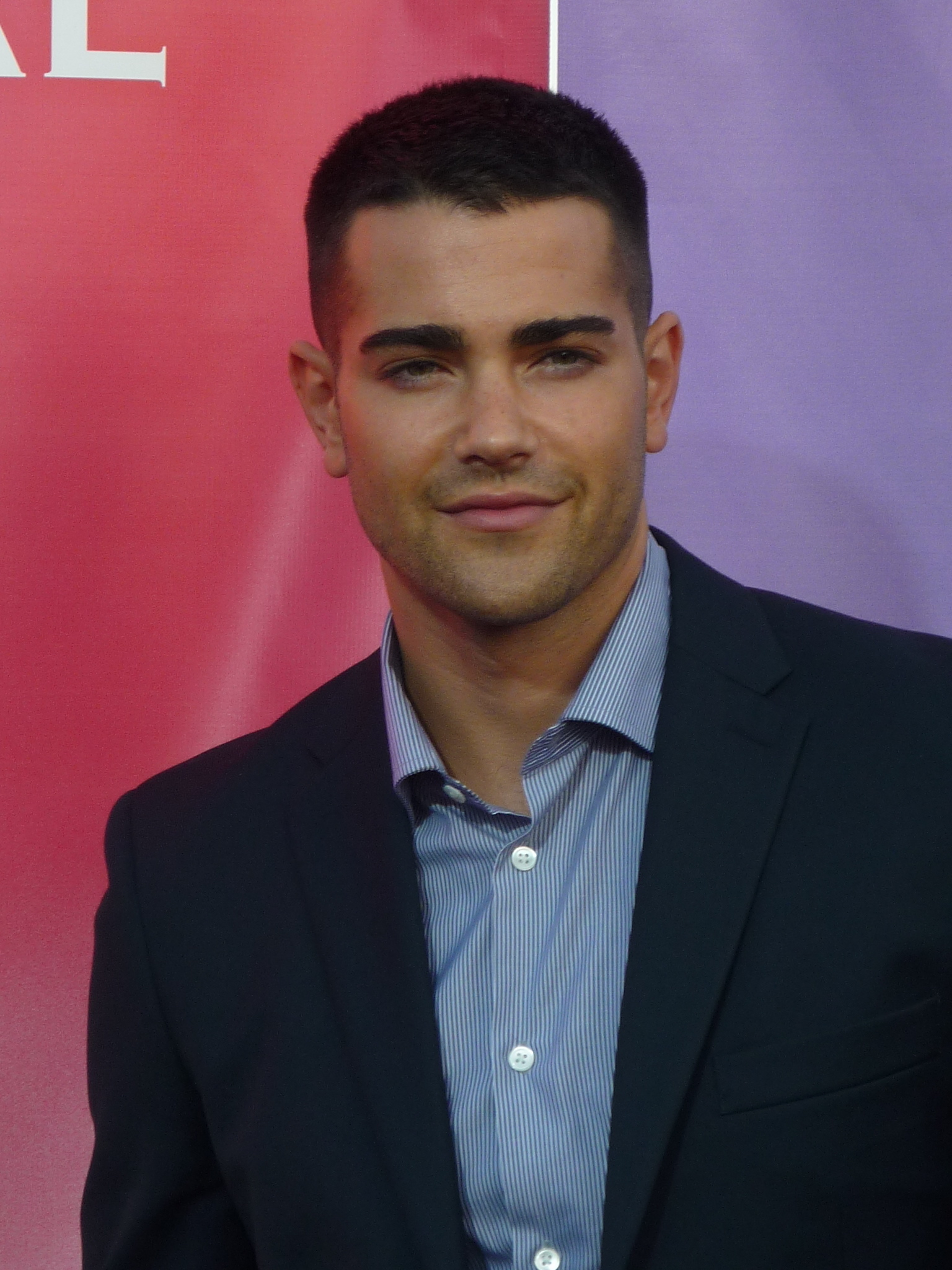
Crew cut: top, short; back/sides, short taper; sideburns, semi-short; short pomp (pompadour) front, arched; mid top, rounded; crown, rounded; front hairline, slightly asymmetric with a cow lick at off center right; wavy hair. Jesse Metcalfe.

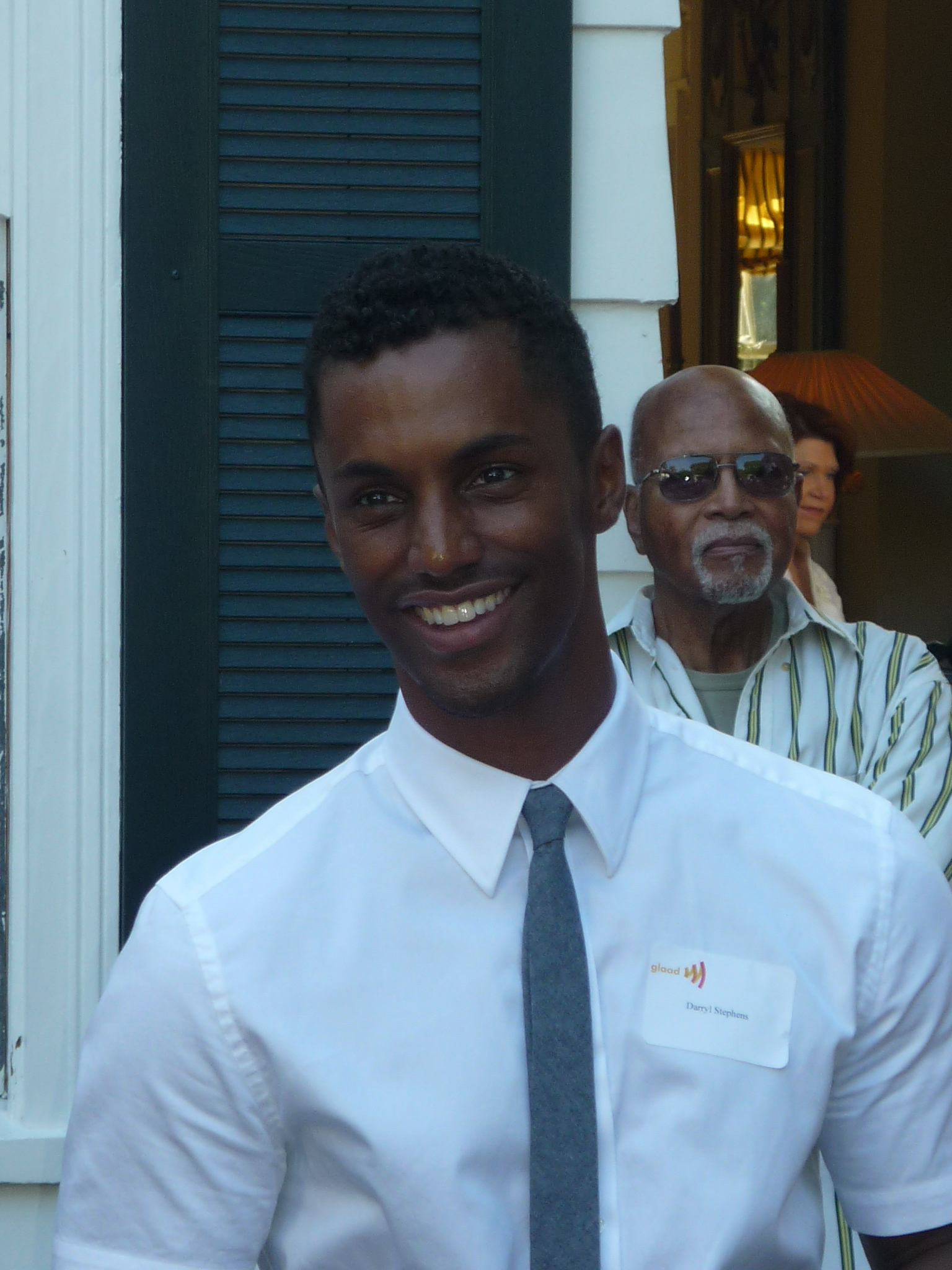
Crew cut: top, medium; back/sides, semi-short taper; sideburns, long; short pomp (pompadour) front, arched; mid top, rounded; crown, rounded; front hairline, average, very curly hair. Darryl Stephens.

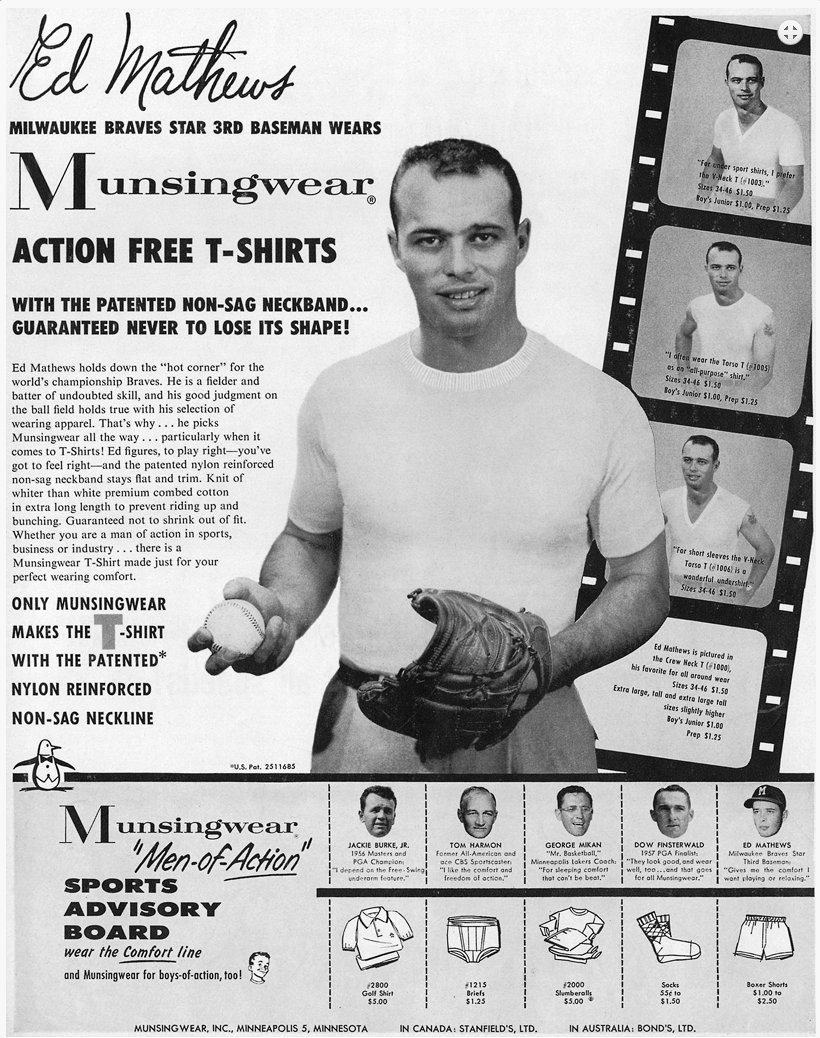
Crew cut: top, medium; back/sides, semi-short taper; sideburns, semi-short; short pomp (pompadour) front, arched; mid top, flattened; crown, flattened; front hairline, widow peak receded; curly hair

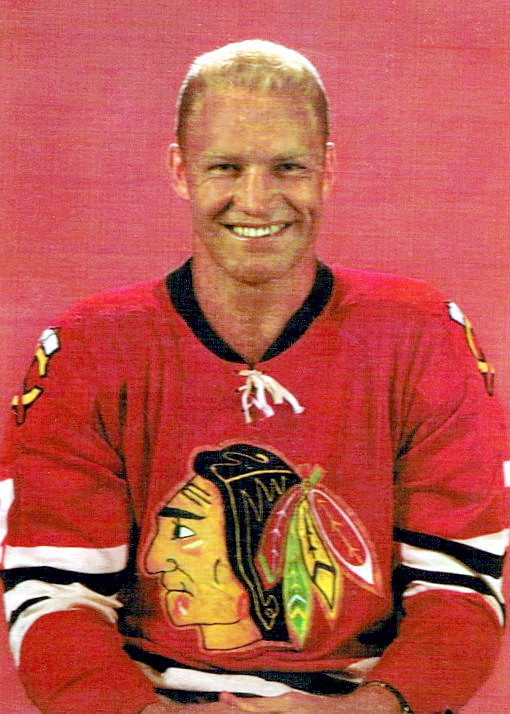
Crew cut: top, medium; back/sides, medium taper; sideburns, medium; short pomp (pompadour) front, flattened; mid top, rounded; crown, rounded; front hairline, average; curly hair. Bobby Hull.

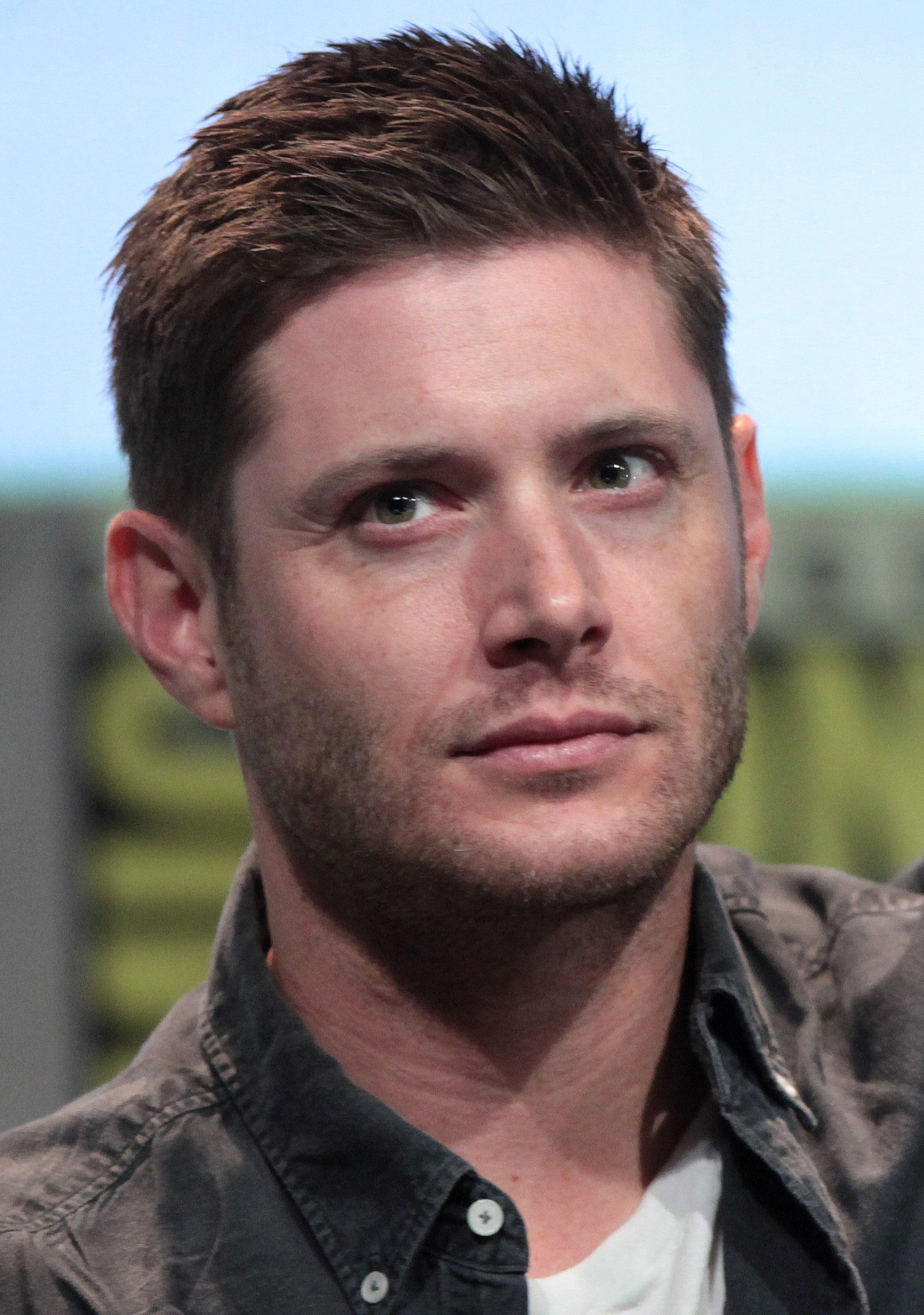
Crew cut: top, long; back/sides, medium taper; sideburns, medium; short pomp (pompadour) front, arched; mid top, rounded; crown, rounded; front hairline, lower than average; straight hair. Jensen Ackles.

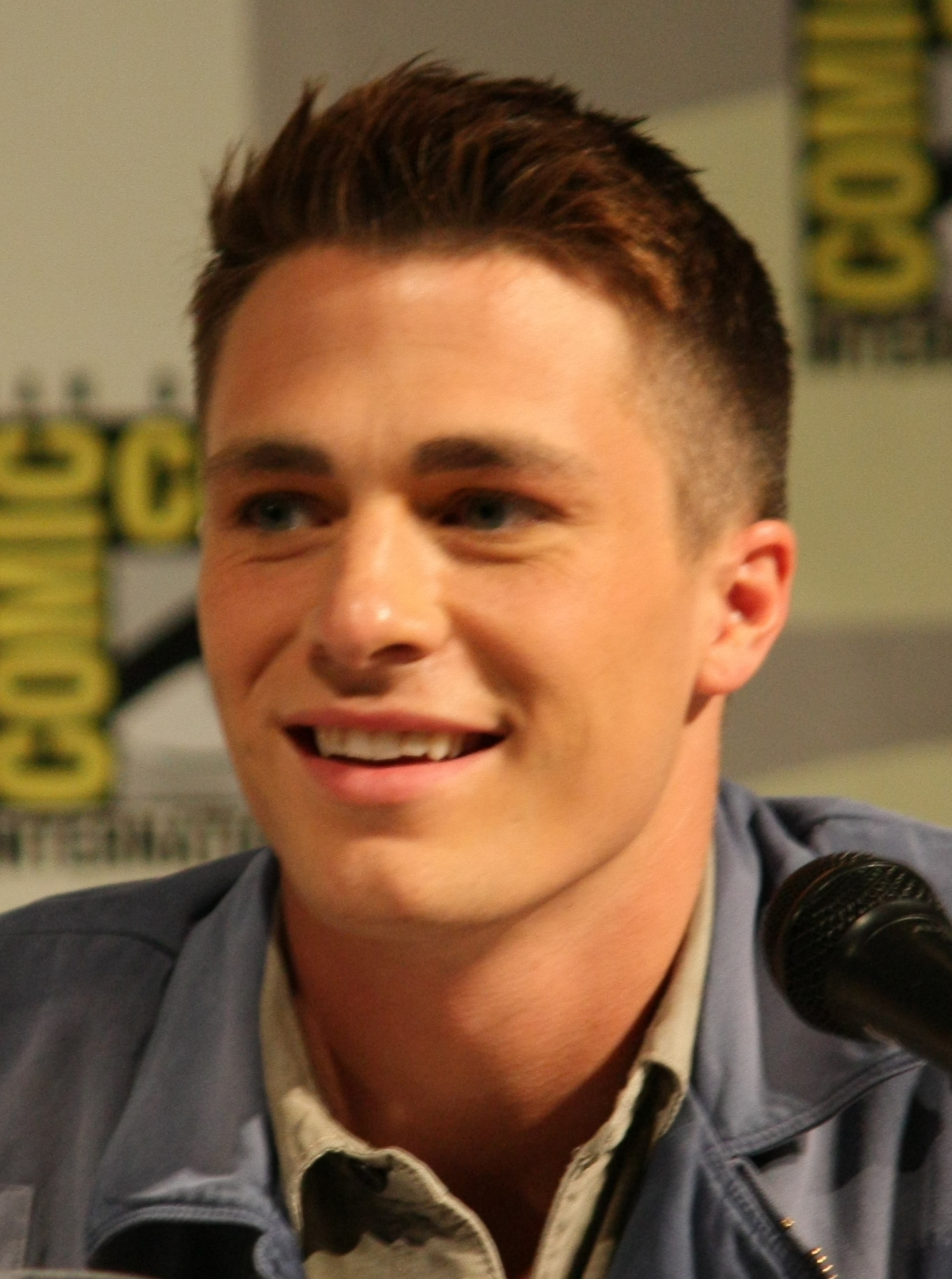
Crew cut: top, long; back/sides, semi-short taper; sideburns, short; short pomp (pompadour) front, arched; mid top, rounded; crown, rounded; front hairline, average; wavy hair. Colton Haynes.

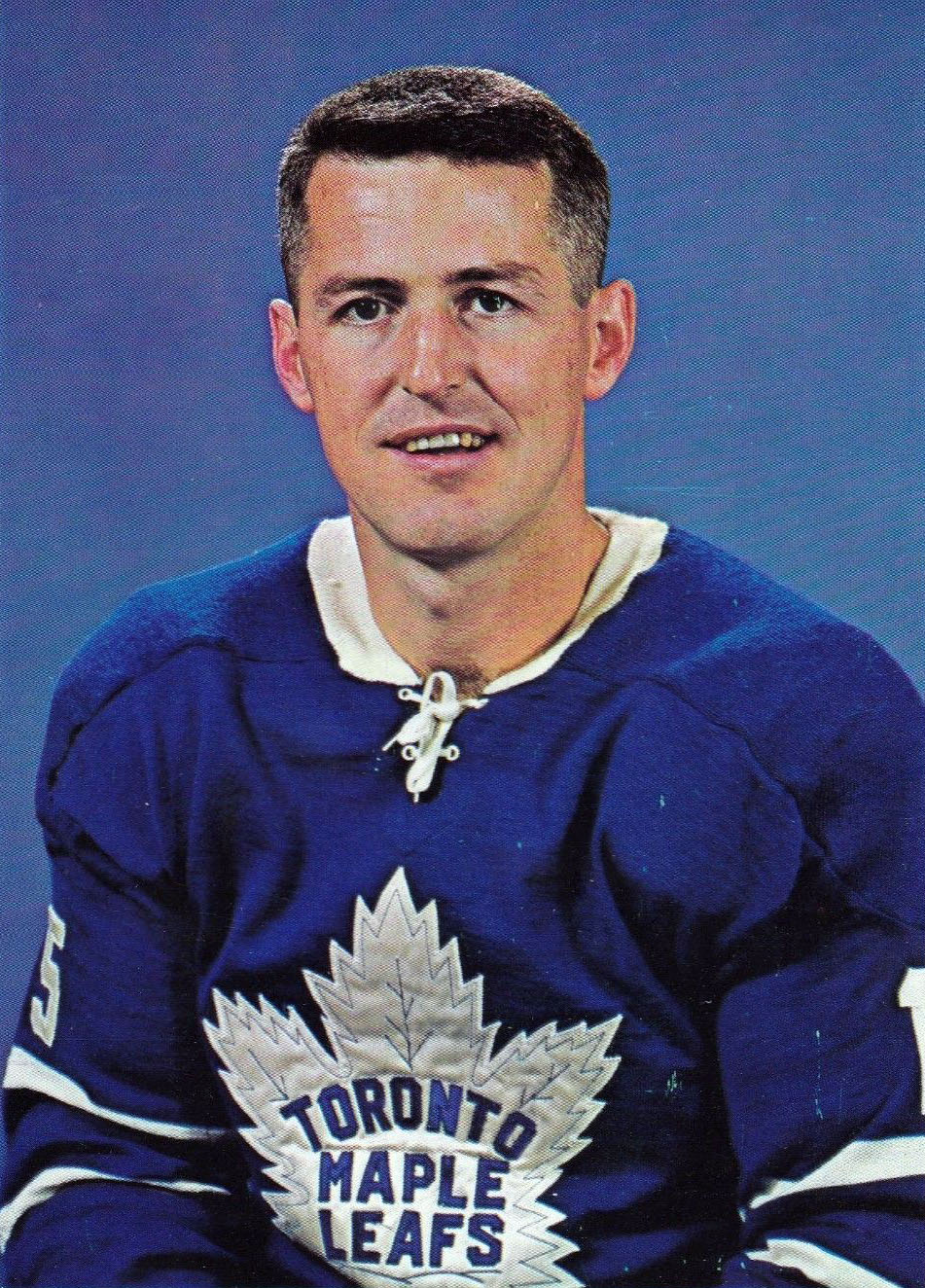
Billy Harris

== See also ==
- List of hairstyles
- Blades and guards
- Brush cut
- Butch cut
- Buzz cut
- Flattop
- High and tight
- Ivy League
- Regular haircut
- Undercut

== Bibliography ==
- Moler, A.B. (1911). Standardized Barbers' Manual. Unnattributed Publisher.
- Thorpe, S.C. (1958). Practice and Science of Standard Barbering. Milady Publishing Corporation.
- Thorpe, S.C. (1967). Practice and Science of Standard Barbering. Milady Publishing Corporation.
- Trusty, L. Sherman (1971). The Art and Science of Barbering. Wolfer Printing Co.
