= Commercial Real Estate Women =

US professional association

Commercial Real Estate Women (CREW) Network
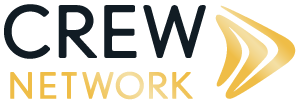
- Founded: 1989
- Type: Professional association
- Purpose: Advancement of women in commercial real estate
- Location: Lawrence, United States
- Region served: United States, Canada and United Kingdom
- Method: Research initiative, Professional development sessions and Business networking

Commercial Real Estate Women (CREW) Network is a professional association for women in the real estate profession. There are various chapters of CREW throughout the United States which create programming focused on business networking, social and educational programs and the advancement of women in commercial real estate.

== About ==
Commercial Real Estate Women (CREW) Network works to educate women about opportunities in commercial real estate. The organization was founded in 1989. CREW has over 11,000 members worldwide, and the organization has four main initiatives: Business Development, Industry Research, Leadership Development, and Career Outreach.

Various chapters of CREW exist throughout the United States. Most chapters focus on networking, social and educational activities for members. By 2007, there were 61 individual chapters in various states. There are currently 80+ chapters or global affiliate groups.

In 1998, CREW created a fund-raising and philanthropic program called CREW Foundation. CREW also has a national conference.
