= Murray's Pomade =

Hairstyling product

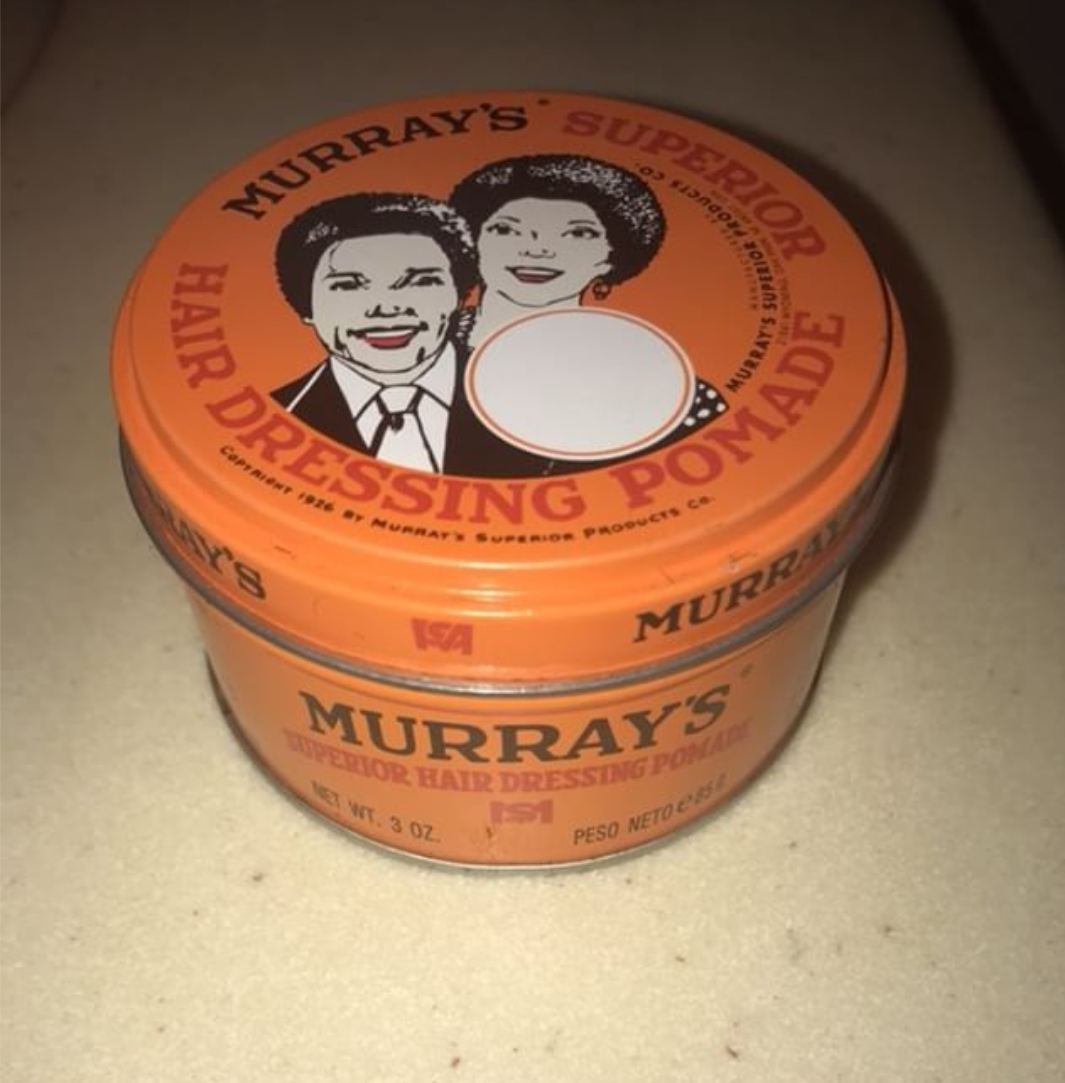
A tin of Murray's Superior Hair Dressing Pomade.

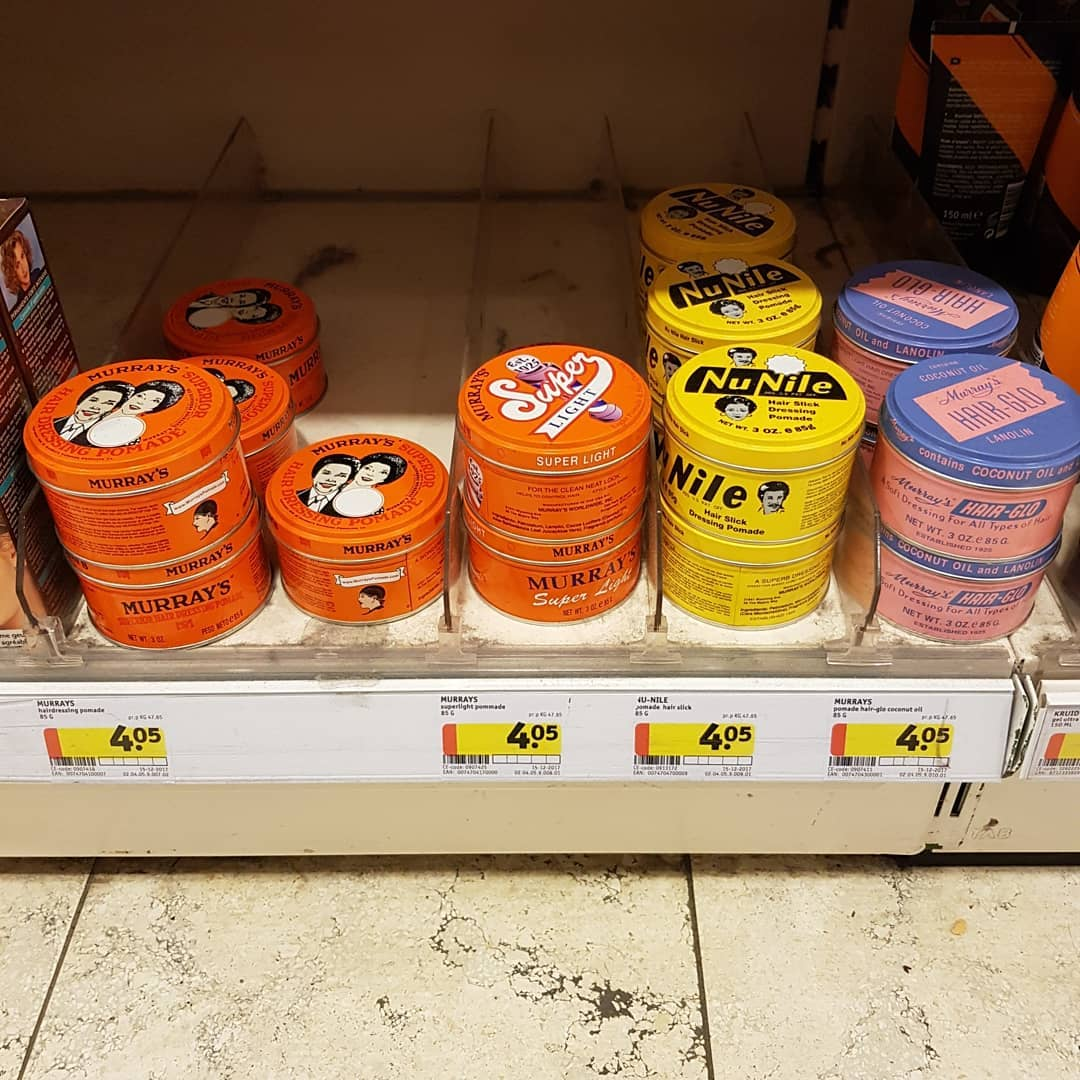
A range of Murray's products in a Dutch drugstore.

Murray's Superior Products Co. is a hair pomade company founded in 1925. The original Murray's is an oil-based pomade with a very thick and waxy consistency.

== History ==
Murray's was originally developed as a heavy-holding waxy pomade by C.D. Murray in 1925. The target consumer was initially black, however the pomade reached out to a wider audience beyond the projected group of consumers. Murray believed that it could be a quality, inexpensive, and successful product and thus began to sell it out of his Chicago barbershop. In 1959 a pharmacist named Harry Berlin began to sell it from his Detroit pharmacy, working closely with Murray's family to market the product.

As of 2017, the Murray's company produces a variety of different products out of their Detroit-based factory.

== Use ==
Murray's Superior is notoriously difficult to wash out compared to most oil-based pomades. On their website, Murray's says to wash hair with dishwashing liquid.
