= Corkscrew Regional Ecosystem Watershed =

Conservation area in Florida

Corkscrew Regional Ecosystem Watershed (CREW) is a conservation area in Florida covering more than 60,000 acres in Lee County, Florida and Collier County, Florida. It provides habitat for species including the Florida panther, snail kite, bobcat, and wood stork. Public trails are part of the preserve. CREW connects to various protected land areas.

The property was purchased for conservation in 1990. The preserve includes a 2.5 mile boardwalk through old growth forest. White orchids and ancient cypress trees grow in the area.

The Audubon Society's Corkscrew Swamp Sanctuary is central to the preserve. Invasive species, natural wildfires, and development are threats to the area. Andrew West has captured photographs of wildlife with trail cameras in the preserve including Florida panther, bobcat, wild hog, deer, and raccoon.

== See also ==
- Florida Wildlife Corridor
