= Della Crewe =

American long-distance motorcyclist

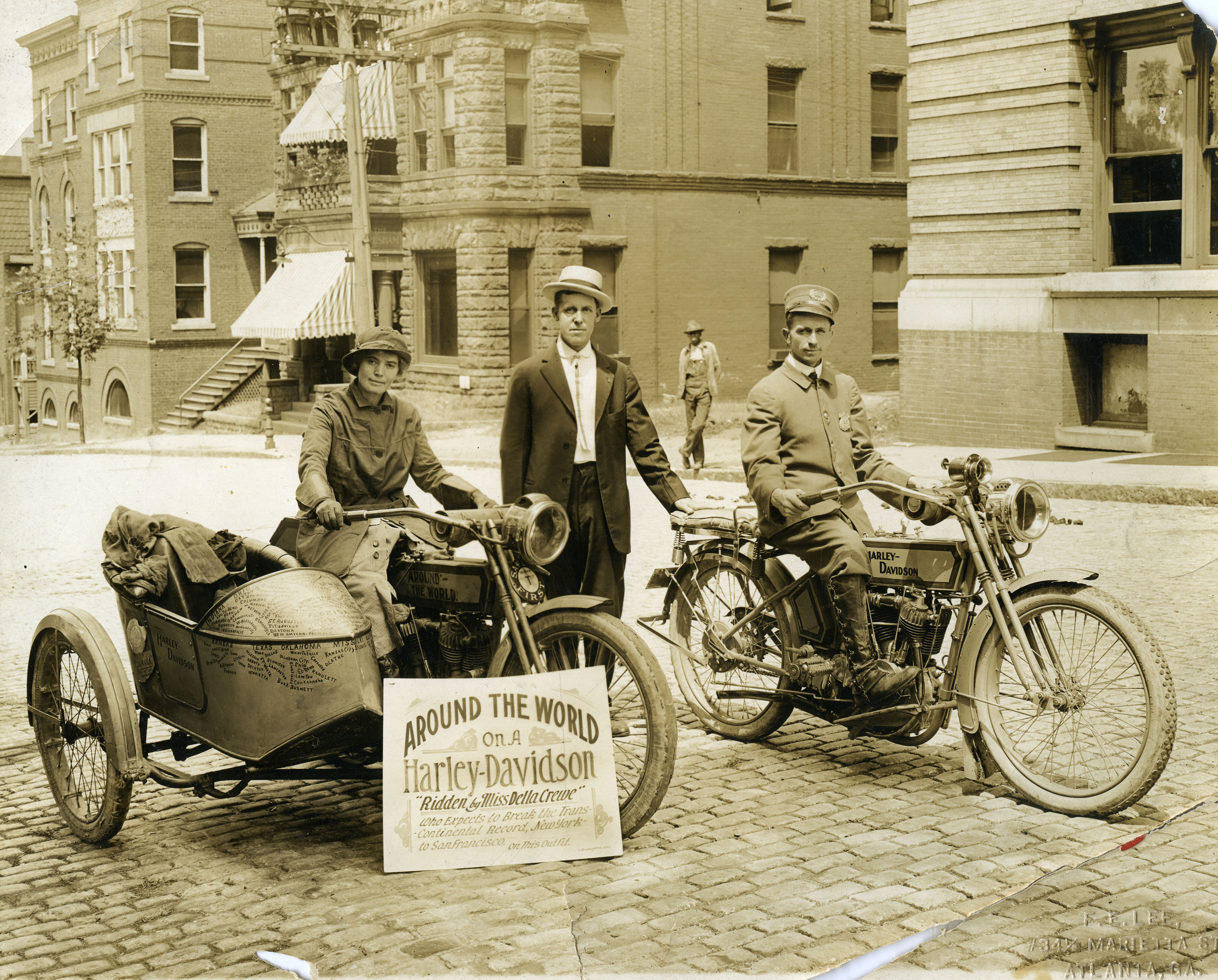
- Crewe (left) in Atlanta, September 1915
- Born: Racine, Wisconsin
- Died: 1926 (aged 41–42)
- Occupation(s): Motorcyclist, manicurist

Della Crewe (1884–1926) was an American long-distance motorcyclist known for her endurance cross-country trip from Waco, Texas to New York City in 1914.

== Early life ==
Della Crewe was born in Racine, Wisconsin and moved to Waco, Texas around 1910. There she worked as a manicurist. She was known for being an experienced traveler, and a family member suggested she explore the country by motorcycle. Her motorcycle for the trip was a Harley-Davidson two-speed twin-engine with an attached sidecar. She called it The Gray Fellow. She was given a Boston Bull Terrier as a gift and she named the dog Trouble, being quoted as saying "Trouble is the only trouble I will have with me on this trip."

== Long distance motorcycling ==
Crewe began her trip on June 24, 1914, and journeyed from Waco to Dodge City, Kansas for motorcycle races. She then went to St. Louis, Missouri for the annual convention of the Federation of American Motorcyclists. In Chicago she met C. H. Lang, Harley-Davidson's first motorcycle dealer. She reached Milwaukee in the autumn where she was feted by the stenographers who worked at the Harley-Davidson offices. Crewe and her dog arrived in New York City in December 1914 after traveling 5,378 miles through ten states over six months. She detailed her travels for the Harley-Davidson Dealer and wrote the names of the locations she had traveled through on her sidecar.

Crewe had been intending to tour through Europe but her plans were changed because of World War I. She instead traveled to Jacksonville, Florida, planning to cycle through the American South continuing to Cuba and South America. She toured through Cuba and then shipped her motorcycle to Panama, visiting the Panama Canal. She next visited Jamaica and Puerto Rico, before returning to Florida where she then rode to New York City a second time. She kept up a correspondence with the Waco Daily Times-Herald which published her long letters recounting her trips.

In 1917 she drove an automobile from New York City to Los Angeles She raised money for this trip by painting and selling landscape paintings while on the road.

== Later life ==
In her later life she worked again as a manicurist and also as a department store clerk and a registrar. She opened her own beauty parlor in Lynwood, California and was working there until her death in 1926.
