= Randolph Crew (cartographer) =

English cartographer (1631–1657)

Randolph or Randal Crew(e), Esq. (1631–1657) was an English amateur cartographer. He executed a map of Cheshire, and died from violence at Paris.

== Life ==
Randolph Crew, second son of Sir Clipsby or Clippesby Crew, by Jane, daughter of Sir John Poultney, and grandson of Sir Ranulphe or Randolph Crew, was born at Westminster on 6 April 1631. Fuller, who styles him "a hopefull gentleman", states that "he drew a map of Cheshire so exactly with his pen that a judicious eye would mistake it for printing, and the graver's skill and industry could little improve it. This map I have seen; and, reader, when my eye directs my hand, I may write with confidence." The map in question was published in Daniel King's The Vale Royall of England, or the County Palatine of Chester Illustrated (folio, London, 1656), a work in which Crew seems to have taken a personal share. On an inscription thereon he states that he drew the map with his own pen, and after it was drawn engraved it at his own expense. This seems to be at variance with Fuller's statement quoted above, unless Fuller is alluding to the original drawing only.

Wishing to perfect his education, Crew travelled abroad, but on 19 September 1657, while walking in the streets of Paris, he was set upon by footpads wearing swords, and received wounds of which he died two days afterwards, at the early age of twenty-six.

== Legacy ==
He was buried in the Huguenots' burying-place in the Faubourg St. Germain at Paris, and a monument was erected to his memory.

Rᴀɴᴅᴜʟᴘʜᴜs Cʀᴇᴡᴇ,
Nobilis Anglus, Domini Clipsbei Crewe
de Crewe-Hall in comitat. Cest. equitis aurati
filius ii^{dus},
Dñi Randulphi Crewe summi Angliæ justiciarii
nepos,
hic sepultus facet in flore suæ ætatis, violentâ
et maleficâ manu
peremptus.
Dum enim placidè per plateas processit flagitioso
quorundam exorbitantium asseclarum gladio
immaniter atque immerenter
confossus est,
et biduo post obiit
xxi. Sept. Anno Dom. ᴍᴅᴄʟᴠɪɪ.
ætatis suæ
xxvii.

Randolph Crewe,
English gentleman, second son of the gilded knight Lord Clipsbei (?) Crewe
of Crewe-Hall in the county of Chester,
grandson of
Lord Randolph Crewe, supreme judge of England.
…
Buried here in the flower of his age, killed by violent
and evil hand.
…
While he was peacefully walking through the streets
he was disgracefully stabbed with the blade of certain followers (?)
inhumanely and undeserved,
…
and after two days he passed away.
21 September 1657.
His age
27.

== Sources ==
- Baigent, Elizabeth (2008). "Crew [Crewe], Randolph [Randall, Ralph] (1631–1657), cartographer". Oxford Dictionary of National Biography (online ed.). Oxford University Press. doi:10.1093/ref:odnb/6684. (Subscription or UK public library membership required.)
- Fuller, Thomas (1811). The History of the Worthies of England. New ed. Nichols, John (ed.). Vol. 1. London: F. C. and J. Rivington; T. Payne; Wilkie and Robinson; Longman, Hurst, Rees, Orme, and Brown; Cadell and Davies; R. H. Evans; J. Mawman; J. Murray; and R. Baldwin. pp. 193–194.
- Nichols, John Gough (1858). The Topographer and Genealogist. Vol. 3. London: John Bowyer Nichols and Sons. p. 299.
- Omerod, George (1819). The History of Cheshire. Vol. 3. London: Lackington, Hughes, Harding, Mavor, and Jones. p. 170.

Attribution:

- This article incorporates text from a publication now in the public domain: Cust, Lionel Henry (1888). "Crew, Randolph". In Stephen, Leslie (ed.). Dictionary of National Biography. Vol. 13. London: Smith, Elder & Co. p. 82.
