= Kusuma =

Kusum may refer to:

== People ==
=== With the given name ===
- Kusuma Hanumantharayappa, Indian politician
- Kusuma Karunaratne, Sri Lankan academic
- Kusuma Murthy, Indian politician
- Kusuma Rajaratne (1925–2007), Sri Lankan politician
- Kusuma Satyanarayana, Indian academic
- Kusuma Shivalli, Indian politician
- Kusuma Wardhani (1964–2023), Indonesian archer
- Kusuma Kumari or Malini (actress), Indian actress
- Kusuma Kumari (Telugu actress) or Rajasree, Indian actress in Telugu cinema

=== With the surnname ===
- Aji Kusuma (born 1999), Indonesian footballer
- Febriana Dwipuji Kusuma (born 2001), Indonesian batminton player
- Iwa Kusuma (born 1970), Indonesian rapper, singer, songwriter, TV presenter, and actor
- Reza Kusuma (born 2000), Indonesian footballer
- Stenny Kusuma (born 1986), Indonesian batminton player
- Sugianto Kusuma (born 1951), Indonesian businessman

== Other uses ==
- Kusuma, Rajasthan
- Schleichera, a genus of trees, kusum or kusuma in Sanskrit
  - Kusum oil, from the seed of the tree

== See also ==
- Kkusum, an Indian television drama
- Kusum Dola, an Indian television series
- Kusum Sarovar, sacred site in Vrindavan, Uttar Pradesh, India
- Kusumagraj (1912–1999), Indian writer and poet
- Kusumba (Maharashtra), a village in Maharashtra, India
- Kusumha Bihar Halt railway station, Bihar, India
