= Kesambi =

Kesambi may refer to:

- the Schleichera tree
- a district of Cirebon in Indonesia
