= Unguent =

Soothing skin preparation

An unguent is a soothing preparation spread on wounds, burns, rashes, abrasions or other topical injuries (i.e., damage to the skin). It is similar to an ointment, though typically an unguent is oilier and less viscous. It is usually delivered as a semi-solid paste spread on the skin, and it is often oily in order to suspend the medication or other active ingredients.

During the Victorian era, the use of the unguent macassar oil on the hair became so popular that antimacassars were invented to prevent damage to furniture.

== Mercurochrome unguent ==
Various preparations of mercurochrome unguent are occasionally used as adjunct therapy in the treatment of furunculosis, and palliative relief of Kaposi sarcomas, although mercurials should only be used in extreme cases due to high toxicity and severe hypersensitivity or idiosyncratic reactions.

It was also used by the Egyptians to help soothe their skin from the dry heat.

== See also ==
- Aegyptiacum
- Cream perfumes
- Salve
- Unguentine
