= Painting of Lady Tjepu =

Ancient Egyptian painting

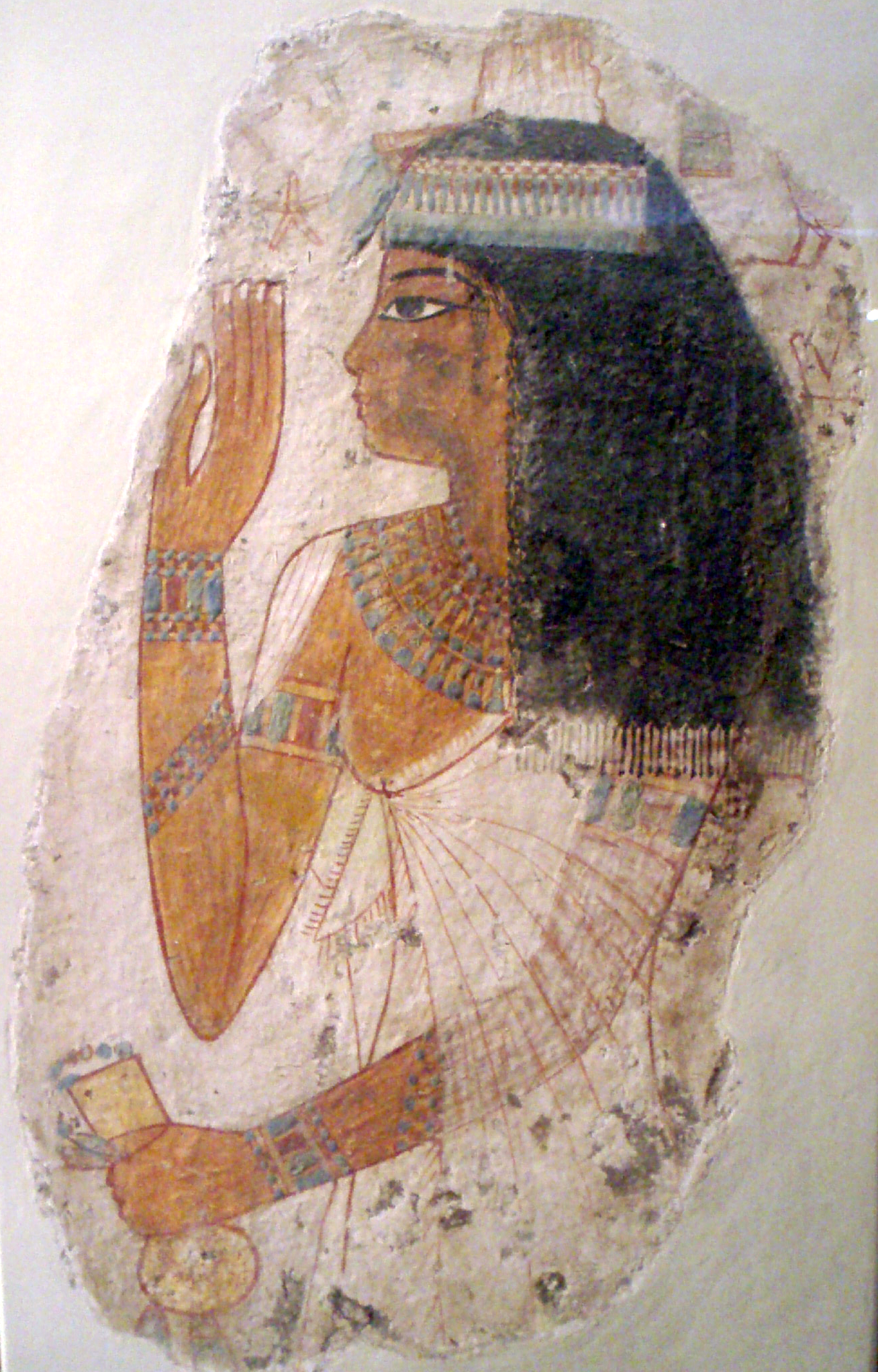
- Painting of Lady Tjepu
- Material: limestone, plaster, pain
- Height: 36.7 centimetres (14.4 in)
- Width: 24 centimetres (9.4 in)
- Created: 1390–1353 BC, 18th Dynasty, New Kingdom
- Discovered: Tomb 181, El-Khokha necropolis, Thebes
- Present location: Brooklyn Museum, New York
- Identification: Brooklyn 65.197

The Painting of Lady Tjepu is a fragment from a large fresco from Tomb 181 in Thebes (Luxor). It dates to the 18th Dynasty reign of Pharaoh Amenhotep III.

The painting depicts an elegantly dressed woman with much jewelry. She holds her head upright and faces straight ahead, her right arm is bent and held up, her left is held at hip height. In her left hand she holds a menat. Her white garment is slightly translucent and in many places her body can be seen underneath it. Her wig is finely worked with a crown of flowers on top. A small head cone on top of her head is made of grease or fat. As a symbol it indicates Tjepu's membership in the upper layer of society. Her name and role as "Lady of the House" are inscribed behind her head.

The complete image showed Tjepu behind Nebamun, her son. Nebamun shared the grave with another sculptor, Ipuki. The depiction of the mother in this position is unusual, as most graves depict the owner's wife in this location. Perhaps this diversion from usual practice indicates a special connection between Nebamun and Tjepu. The space was probably free for the mother because Nebamun married the widow of Ipuki (and made use of his grave) and she was already depicted with Ipuki. Son and mother stand before a shrine, where they bring an offering for the Beautiful Festival of the Valley in honour of the deity Amun. In accordance with tradition, Tjepu is not shown at her real age, but in an idealised, youthful form.

The image is dated to the late 18th Dynasty, in the reign of Pharaoh Amenhotep III (1390–1353 BC). The clothing of Tjepu conforms to the fashion of this time. It was painted on the plaster of the walls of the tomb. The image entered the Brooklyn Museum in 1916 as part of the collection of Charles Edwin Wilbour, where it remains a key piece of the ancient Egyptian collection to this day (inventory number 65.197). Thus, it has been the title image of catalogues of the collection since 1999 and also appeared on the title page of the catalogue edited for the travelling exhibition of pieces from the Brooklyn Museum in Berlin in 1976.

== Literature ==
- Painting of the Woman Tjepu. In: Richard A. Fazzani, James F. Romano, Madeleine E. Cody: Art for Eternity. Masterworks from ancient Egypt. Brooklyn Museum of Art/Scala Publishers, New York 1999, ISBN 0-87273-139-1, S. 90.
