= Kirschner value =

The Kirschner value or Kirschner number is a value determined when examining fat. The Kirschner value is an indicator of how much volatile fatty acid can be extracted from fat through saponification. It consists of the number of milliliters of 0.1 normal sodium hydroxide necessary for the neutralization of water-soluble silver salts made from the water-soluble volatile fatty acids distilled from 5 grams of a given fat.

The Reichert value and Polenske value are related numbers based on similar tests.
