= Masawaiyh =

Medieval physician

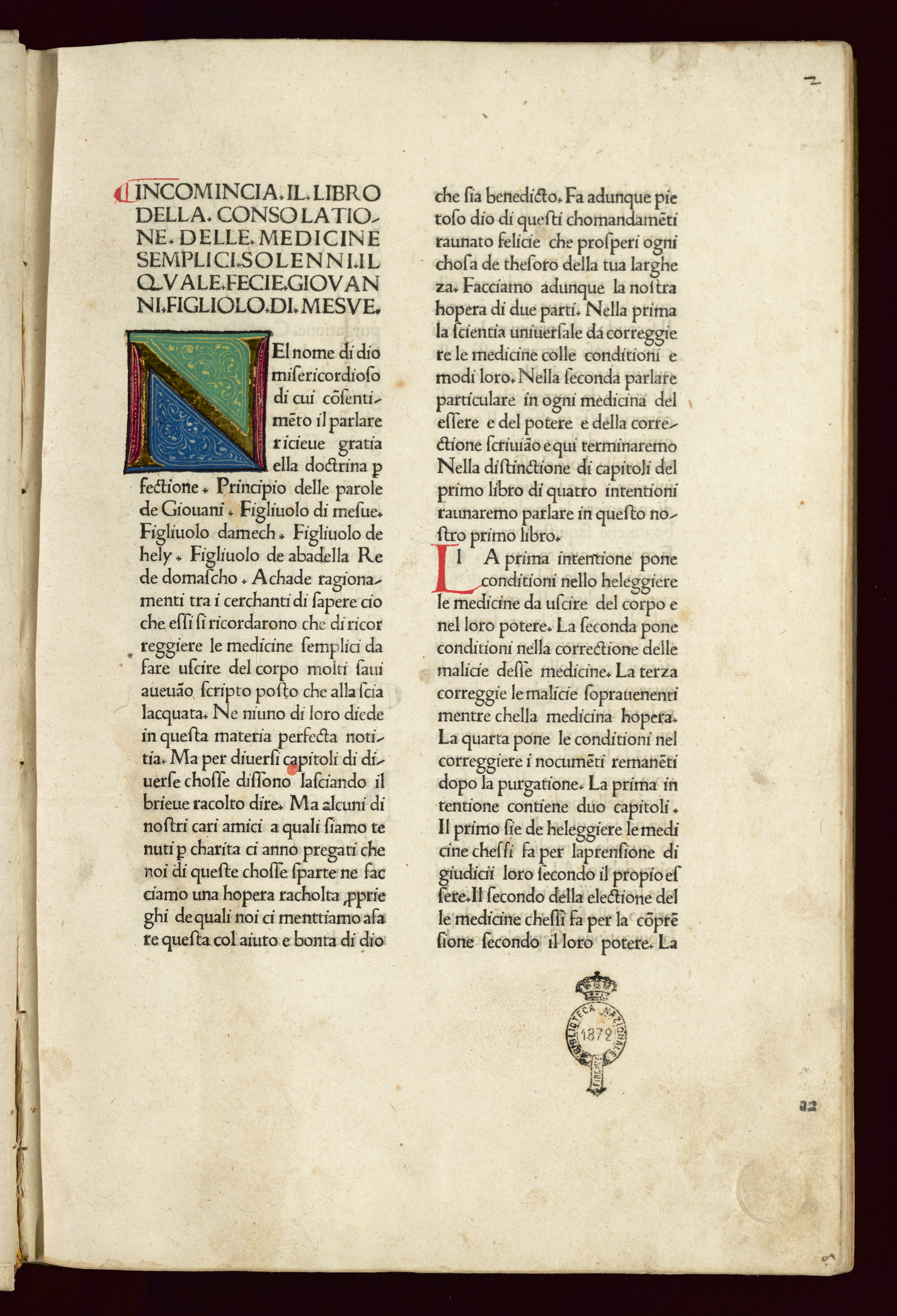
De consolatione medicinarum, 1475

Yuhanna ibn Masawaih (circa 777–857), (Arabic: يوحنا بن ماسويه), also written Ibn Masawaih, Masawaiyh, and in Latin Janus Damascenus, or Mesue, Masuya, Mesue Major, Msuya, and Mesuë the Elder was an Assyrian or Persian physician, trained by Jabril ibn Bukhtishu, who was a member of the Church of the East, from the Academy of Gondishapur. According to The Canon of Medicine for Avicenna and 'Uyun al-Anba for the medieval Arab historian ibn Abi Usaybi'a, Masawaiyh's father was from Khuzestan and his mother was a Slav.

== Life ==
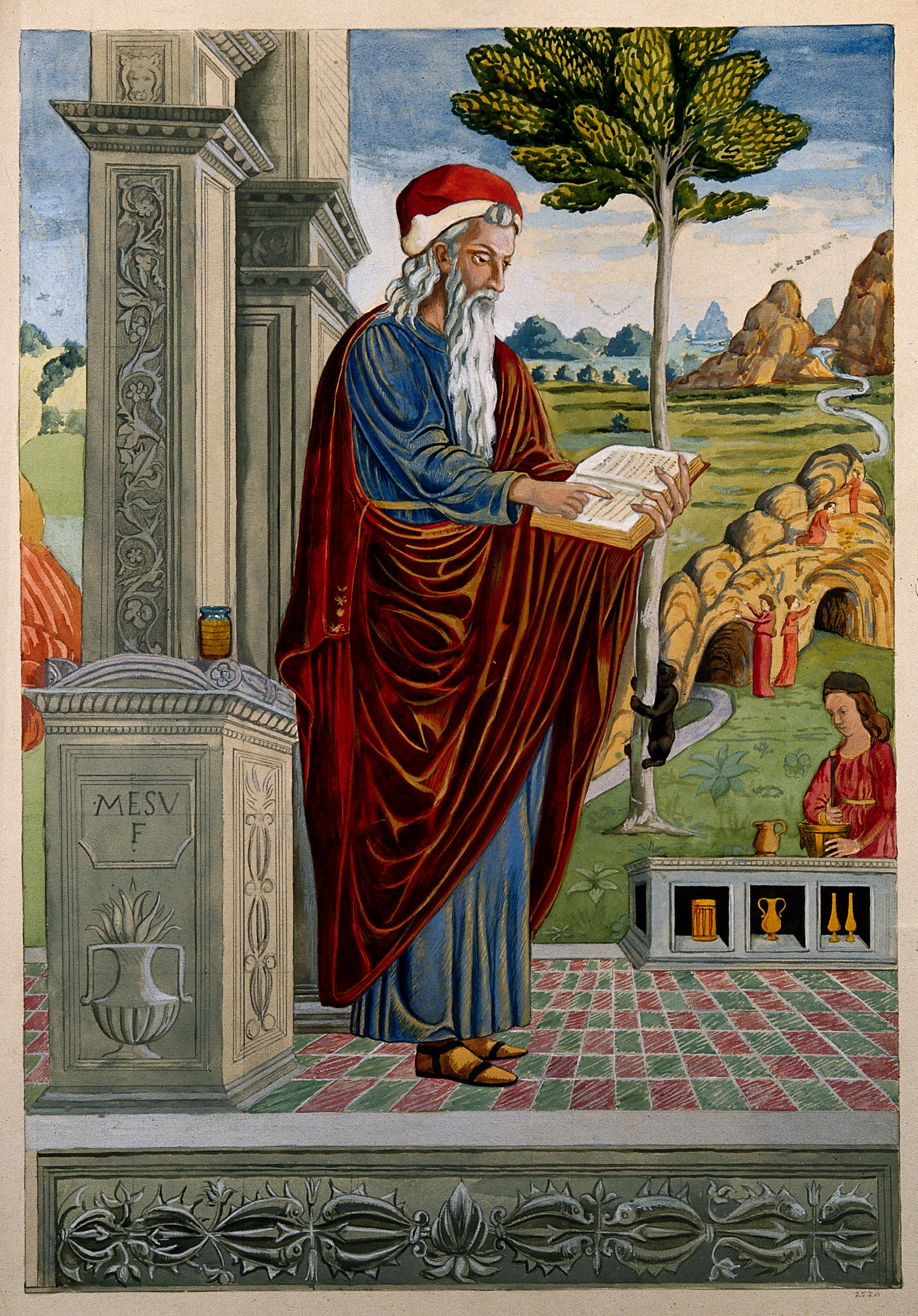
Mesue

Born in 777 as the son of a pharmacist and physician from Gundeshapur, he came to Baghdad and studied under Jabril ibn Bukhtishu.

He became director of a hospital in Baghdad, and was personal physician to four Abbasid caliphs. He composed medical treatises on several topics, including ophthalmology, fevers, leprosy, headache, melancholia, dietetics, the testing of physicians, and medical aphorisms. One of Masawaiyh's treatises concerns aromatics, entitled, On Simple Aromatic Substances.

It was reported that Ibn Masawayh regularly held an assembly where he consulted with patients and discussed subjects with his pupils. Ibn Masawayh attracted considerable audiences, having acquired a reputation for repartee.

He was also the teacher of Hunayn ibn Ishaq. He translated various Greek medical works into Syriac, but wrote his own work in Arabic. Apes were supplied to him by Caliph al-Mu'tasim for dissection.

Many anatomical and medical writings are credited to him, notably the Disorder of the Eye (Daghal al-ʿayn), which is the earliest systematic treatise on ophthalmology extant in Arabic, and The Aphorisms, the Latin translation of which was very popular in the Middle Ages.

He died in Samarra in 857.

== See also ==
- Aegyptiacum
- Ophthalmology in medieval Islam

== Sources ==
For his life and writings, see:

- Liber primus, seu methodus medicamenta purgantia simplicia . Bernuz, Caesaraugustae 1550 Digital edition by the University and State Library Düsseldorf
- De re medica . Rouillius / Rolletius, Lugduni 1550 (translated by Jacques Dubois) Digital edition by the University and State Library Düsseldorf
- J.-C. Vadet, "Ibn Masawayh" in, The Encyclopaedia of Islam, 2nd edition, ed. by H.A.R. Gibbs, B. Lewis, Ch. Pellat, C. Bosworth et al., 11 vols. (Leiden: E.J. Brill, 1960-2002) vol. 3, pp. 872–873
- Manfred Ullmann, Die Medizin im Islam, Handbuch der Orientalistik, Abteilung I, Ergänzungsband vi, Abschnitt 1 (Leiden: E.J. Brill, 1970), pp. 112–115
- Fuat Sezgin, Medizin-Pharmazie-Zoologie-Tierheilkunde bis ca 430 H., Geschichte des arabischen Schrifttums, Band 3 (Leiden: E.J. Brill, 1970), pp. 231–236.
- Elgood, Cyril (2010-10-31). A Medical History of Persia and the Eastern Caliphate: From the Earliest Times Until the Year A.D. 1932. Cambridge University Press. pp. 94–. ISBN 978-1-108-01588-2.
- Withington, Edward Theodore (1894). Medical history from the earliest times: a popular history of the healing art. The Scientific Press, Ltd. pp. 141–.
