= Solid perfume =

Perfumes that are solid rather than liquid

Solid perfumes or cream perfumes are perfumes in solid state rather than the liquid mix of alcohol (ethanol) and water used in eau de parfum, eau de toilette, eau de cologne, etc. Normally the substance that gives the cream its base comes from a type of wax that is initially melted. Once melted, a scent or several scents may be added.

Solid perfume is used either by rubbing a finger or dipping a cotton swab against it and then onto the skin. Sometimes solid perfume can take more time for the deeper notes to come out than a spray perfume.

The latest solid perfumes are designed as handbag aromas, as a compact way of making perfume more portable.

Historically, ointment-like unguents have been used as a type of solid perfume since Egyptian times.

== Storage ==
Solid perfume is best kept in a dry area with mild temperature, and avoiding light. This prevents the perfume from melting, drying out, and changing its chemistry.

== Advantages ==
Solid perfume is portable. It can be transported in things like a bag or pocket, and is airport safe. It also usually does not contain any alcohol making it suitable for people with sensitive skin. Moisturizing ingredients such as shea butter or beeswax are commonly used as ingredients. Solid perfumes also contribute to environmental advantage as it is often sold in reusable packaging. This allows for a smaller carbon footprint.

== Disadvantages of solid perfumes ==
- They do not contain alcohol to enhance the diffusion of the essence, so they do not spread over a wide area like liquid perfumes.
- Due to the wax content, their form may deteriorate when exposed to prolonged sunlight or heat. They are less resistant to external factors compared to liquid perfumes.
- Their dense oil-based composition can cause excessive shine or an uncomfortable feeling on oily skin.

== See also ==
- Head cone
