= Head cone =

Conical ornament worn on the head in Ancient Egypt

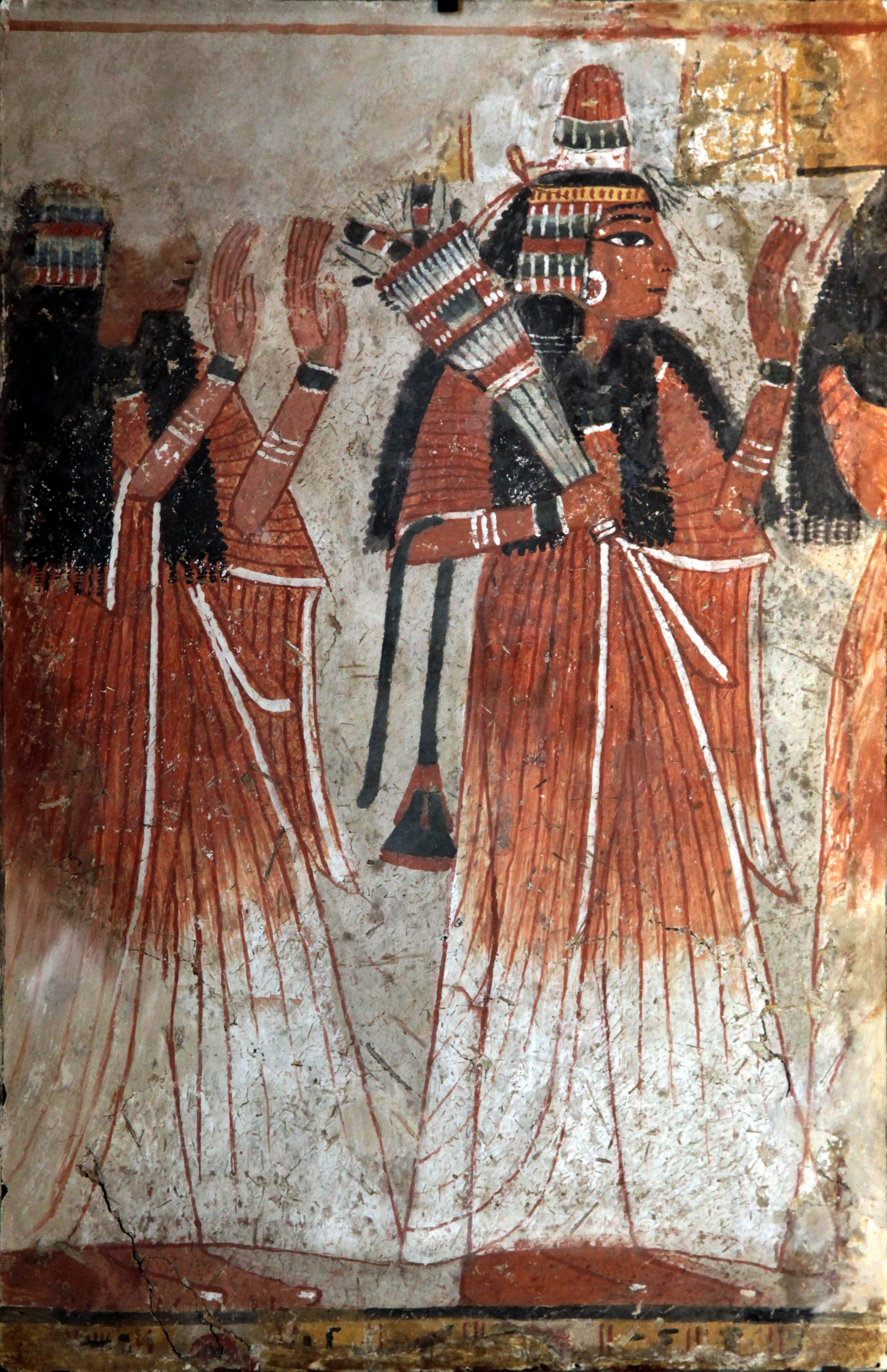
Painting of the 13th century BCE showing women in ceremonial attire, one at least wearing a perfume cone.

Head cones, also known as perfume cones or wax cones, were a type of conical ornament worn atop the head in ancient Egypt. They are often depicted on paintings and bas-reliefs of the era, but were not found as archaeological evidence until 2009 in Amarna, according to research published in 2019.

== Function ==
Head cones were a form of solid perfume, containing myrrh, that were presumably made of a mixture of oils, resins and fat. Images of the era show people wearing them on wigs or on shaved heads. The slow melting of the cones due to bodily heat would have spread the fragrance.

== Head cone outfit ==
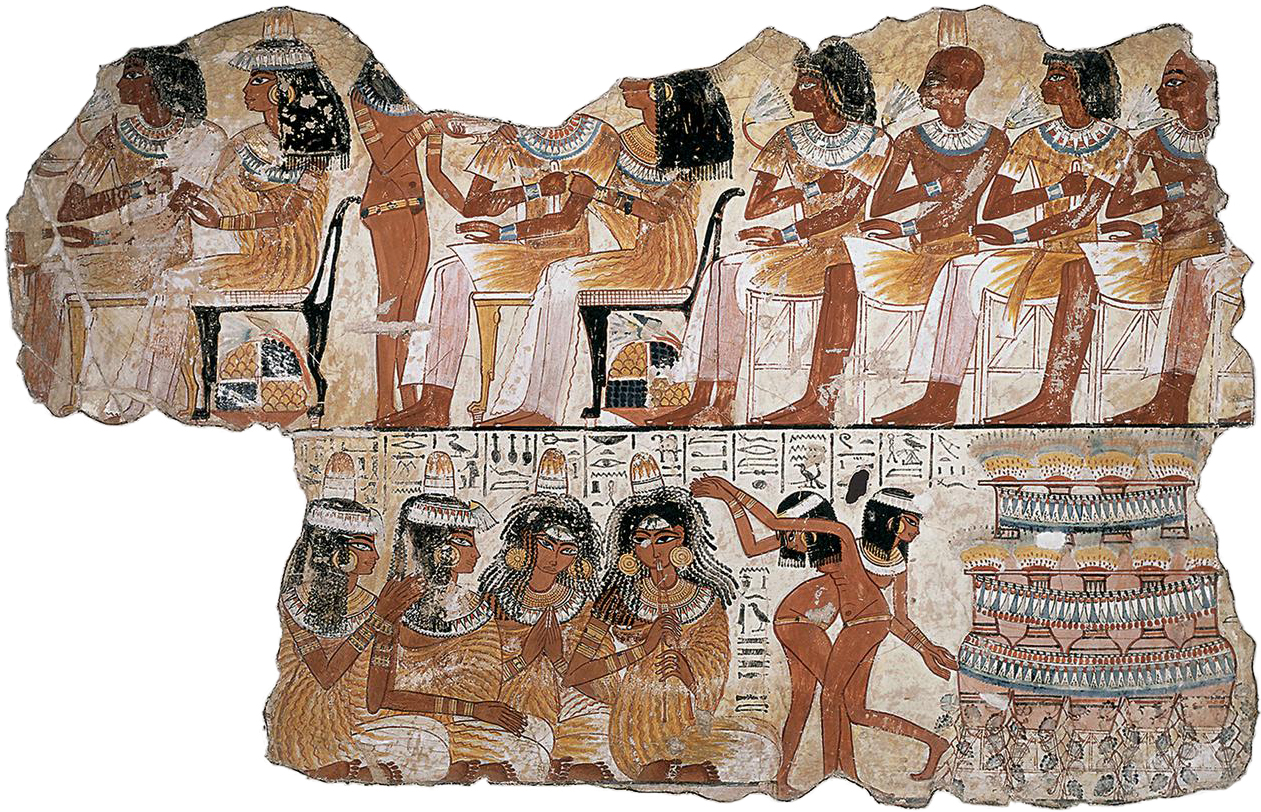
Banquet guests wearing head cones and amber-tinted head cone outfit, painting from the Tomb of Nebamun, c. 1350 BCE, now in the British Museum

People wearing the cones are often depicted wearing long, translucent Sheer fabric dresses, and on some occasions kilts, with a fold of the dress draped over the left shoulder. In coloration, the dresses often resemble the cones themselves. The skirts of the dresses are white, while the upper portions are orange or amber. Distinct lines and squiggles are sometimes painted running through the orange portions and over the wearers' arms, and the bottoms of the orange portions often terminate in streaky patterns that seem to fade into the white parts of the dresses.

Both men and women wearing the cones almost always wear headbands with ornamentation running around the front and sides of the head, with a string circling around the back. Similar bands can sometimes be seen going around the cones themselves. Lotus flowers drape over the fronts of the headbands, or sometimes come out of the fronts of the bands or out of the cones themselves. In a few instances where there is no lotus flower on the head, it can be seen instead in the wearer's hand near their face. Since these instances are portrayed adjacent to other people wearing the flower, it may be supposed that the wearer has removed the flower for the purpose of smelling it.

In a few depictions, where several seated women are being attended by young, nude girls, it can be seen that one or two of the women wear no headband. White strips dangle from the hands of the girls, and it may be supposed that the girls are in the process of distributing the bands. Other girls bear cones in their hands as they attend to the women.

== Depiction ==
The first known depictions of the perfume cones date from the reign of Hatshepsut, in scenes of banquets or funerals. From then on, they are often seen in scenes of worship and funerals. From the Third Intermediate Period, their depiction is limited to a scene of worship.

The shape of the cones varies over the 18th and 19th Dynasties, which constitutes an aid for dating the works. From the 20th Dynasty onwards, depictions of the cones become schematic.

Depictions of perfume cones
Modern drawing of a noblewoman with a head cone

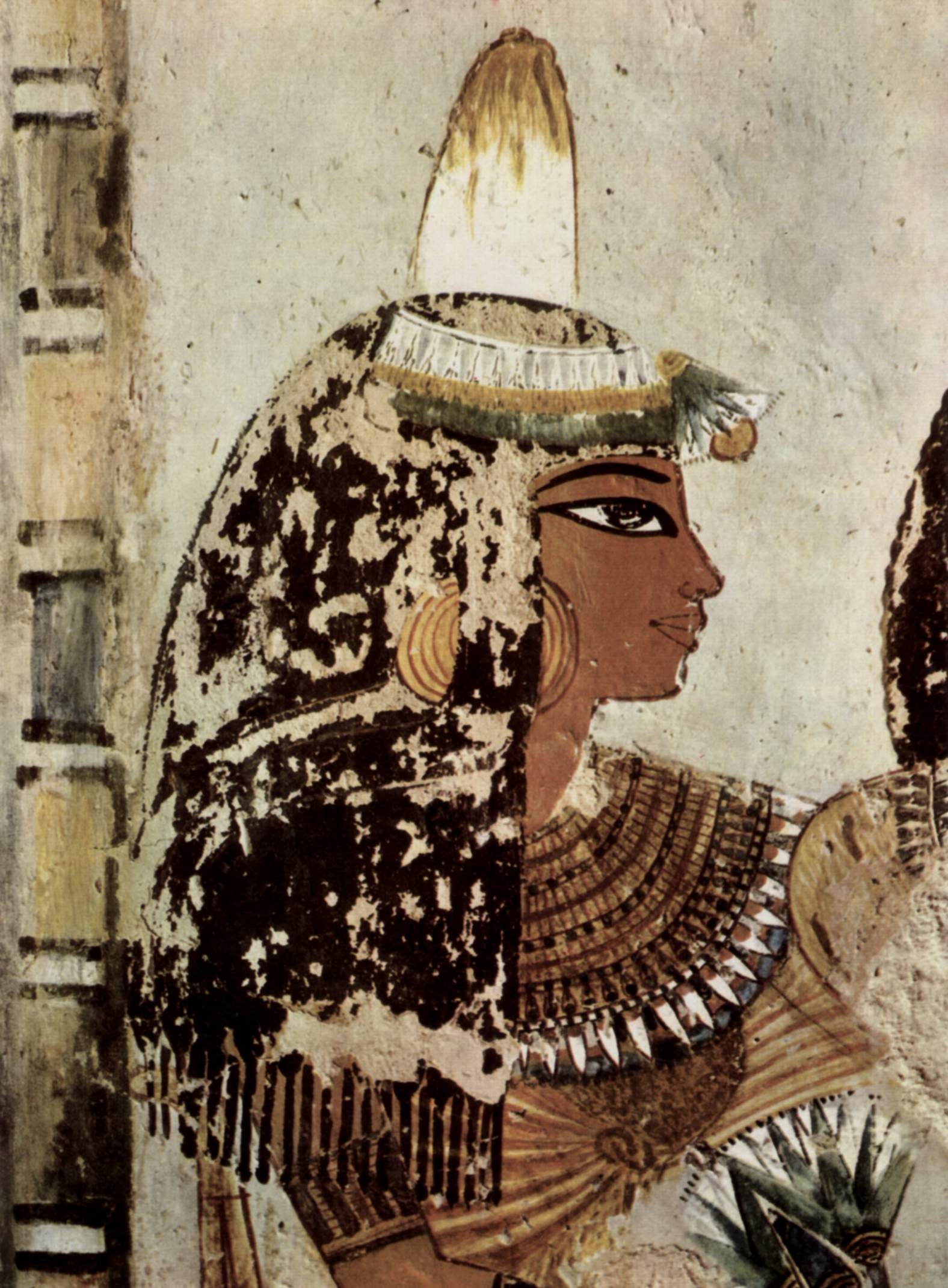
Woman wearing a perfume cone, circa 1422–1411 BC

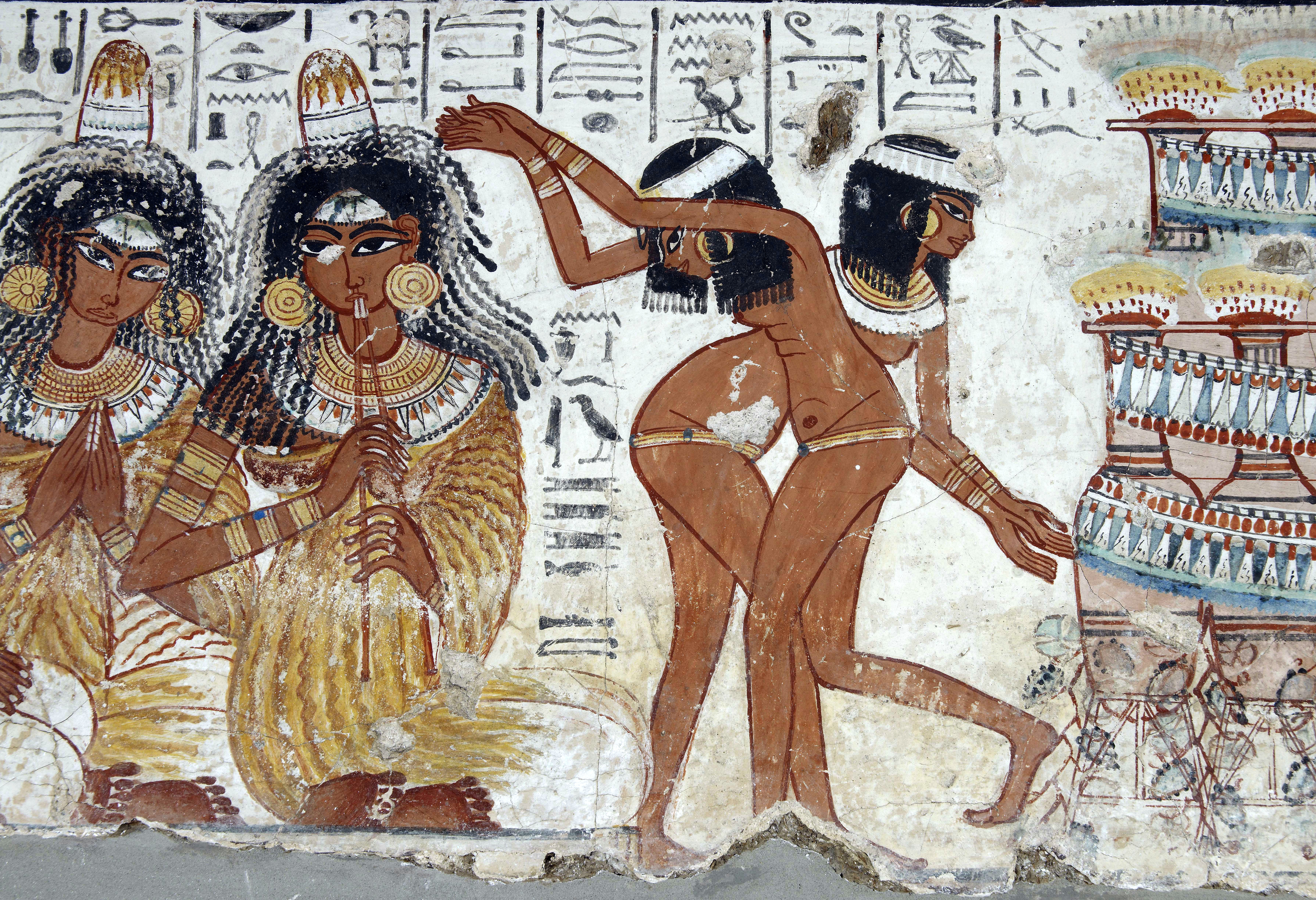
Musicians wearing perfume cones, circa 1400 BC

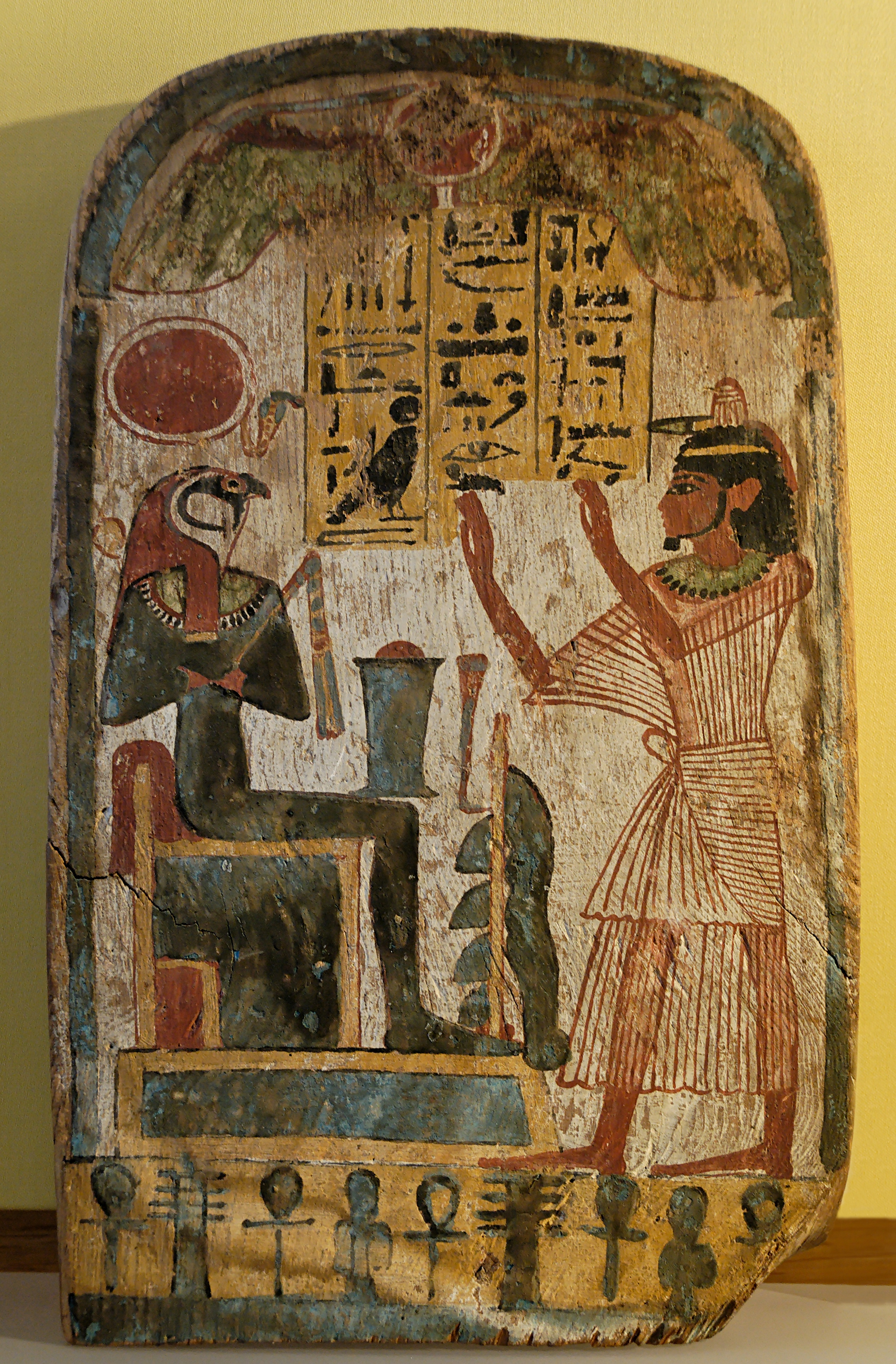
Priest Renpetmaa wearing a perfume cone, worshipping Re-Harachte, circa 900 BC

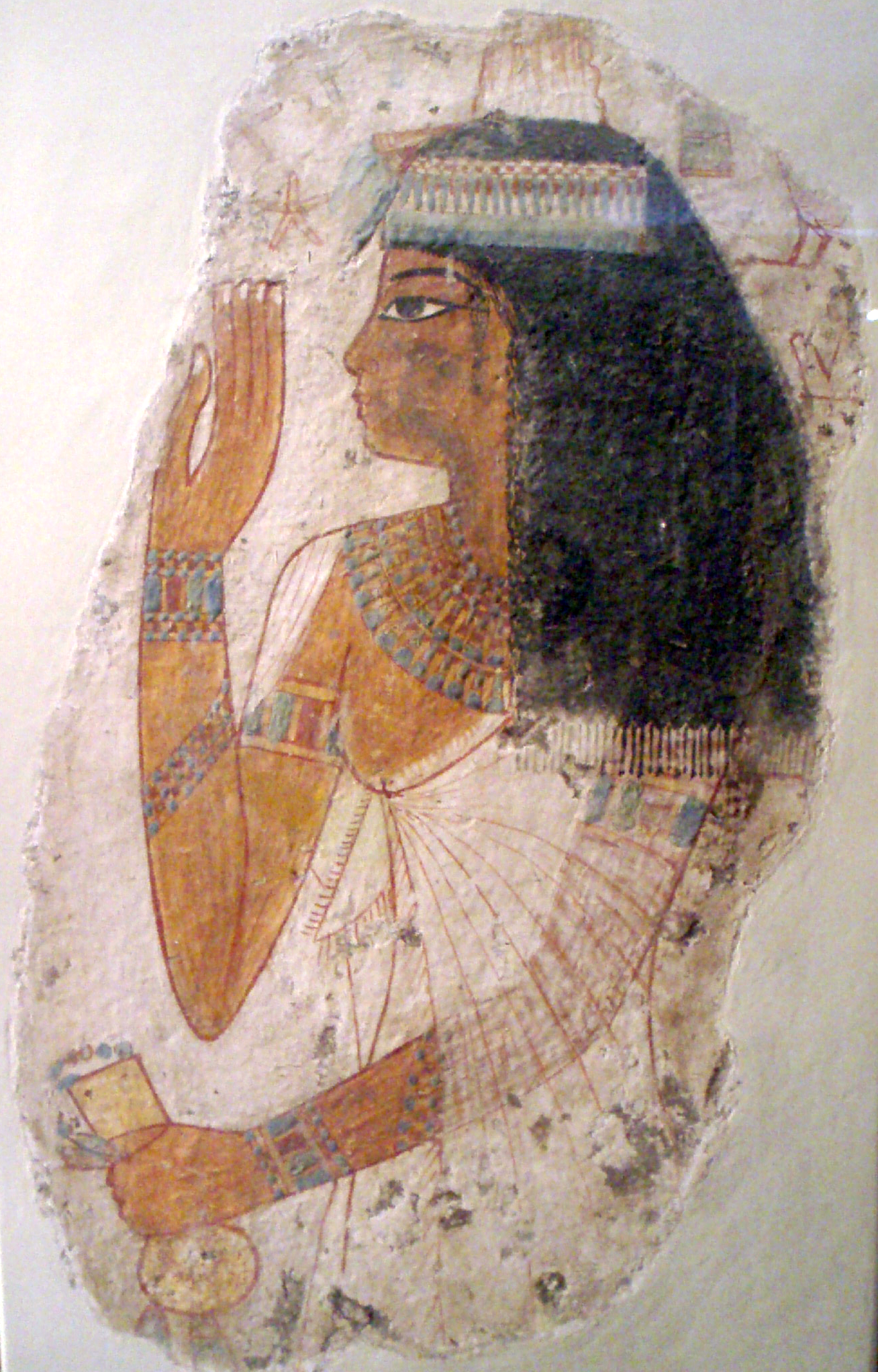
Painting of Lady Tjepu, 1390–1353 BC

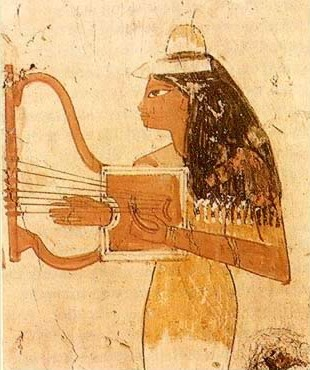
Musician wearing a perfume cone and playing the lyre

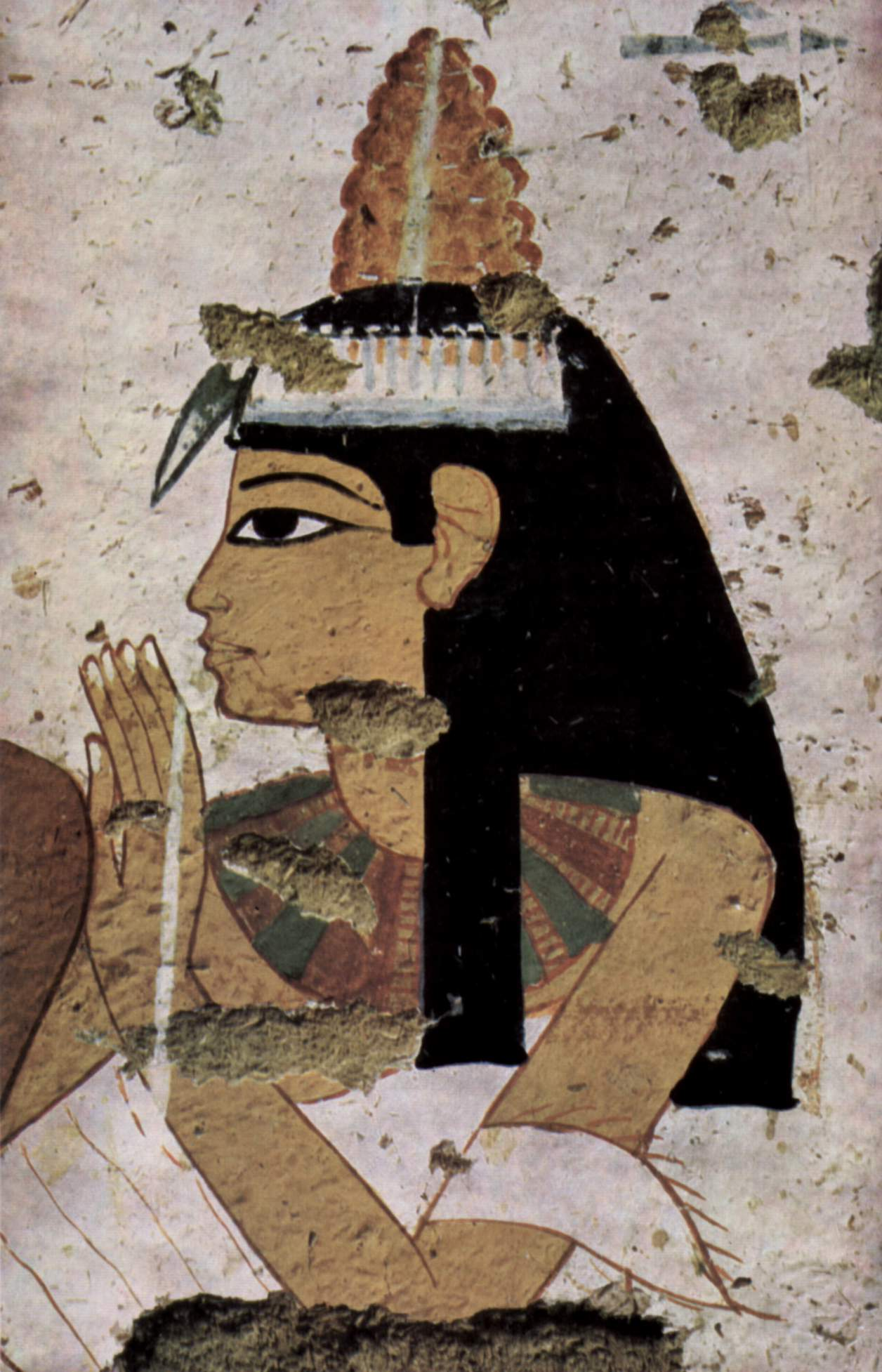
Woman wearing a perfume cone, 1350–1300 BC

== See also ==
- Solid perfume
- Encaustic painting
- Kyphi
- Psalm 133

== Notes and references ==
=== Bibliography ===
- Rainer Hannig: Großes Handwörterbuch Ägyptisch-Deutsch: (2800-950 v. Chr.). von Zabern, Mainz 2006, ISBN 3-8053-1771-9, p. 258.
- Monika Silke Randl: Die Entwicklung der Salbkegel im Flachbild. Diplomarbeit, Universität Wien 2008
