= Reichert value =

Number of volatile water-soluble fatty acids in saponified fat

The Reichert value (also Reichert-Meissl number, Reichert-Meissl-Wollny value or Reichert-Meissl-Wollny number) is a value determined when examining fats and oils. The Reichert value is an indicator of how much volatile fatty acid can be extracted from a particular fat or oil through saponification. It is equal to the number of millilitres of 0.1 normal hydroxide solution necessary for the neutralization of the water-soluble volatile fatty acids distilled and filtered from 5 grams of a given saponified fat. (The hydroxide solution used in such a titration is typically made from sodium hydroxide, potassium hydroxide, or barium hydroxide.)

This number is a useful indicator of non-fat compounds in edible fats, and is especially high in butter.

The value is named for the chemists who developed it, Emil Reichert and Emerich Meissl.

The Polenske value and Kirschner value are related numbers based on similar tests. The Reichert-Meissel value for milk ranges between 28.5 and 33.
