= Kusum oil =

Oil from the seed of the Kusum tree

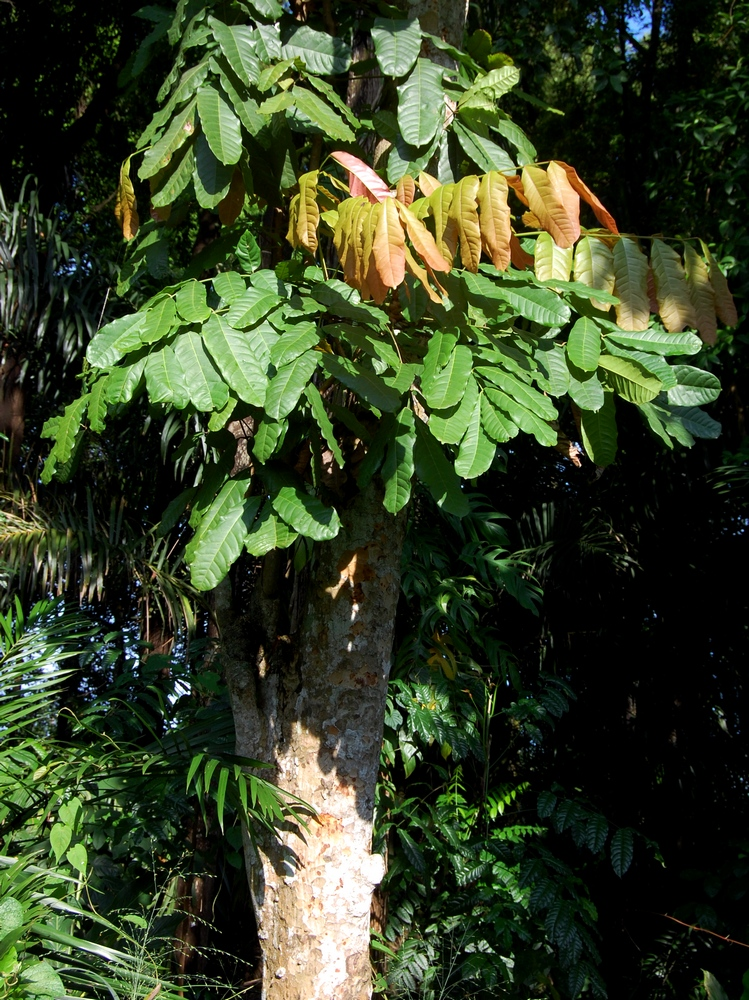
A Kusum tree

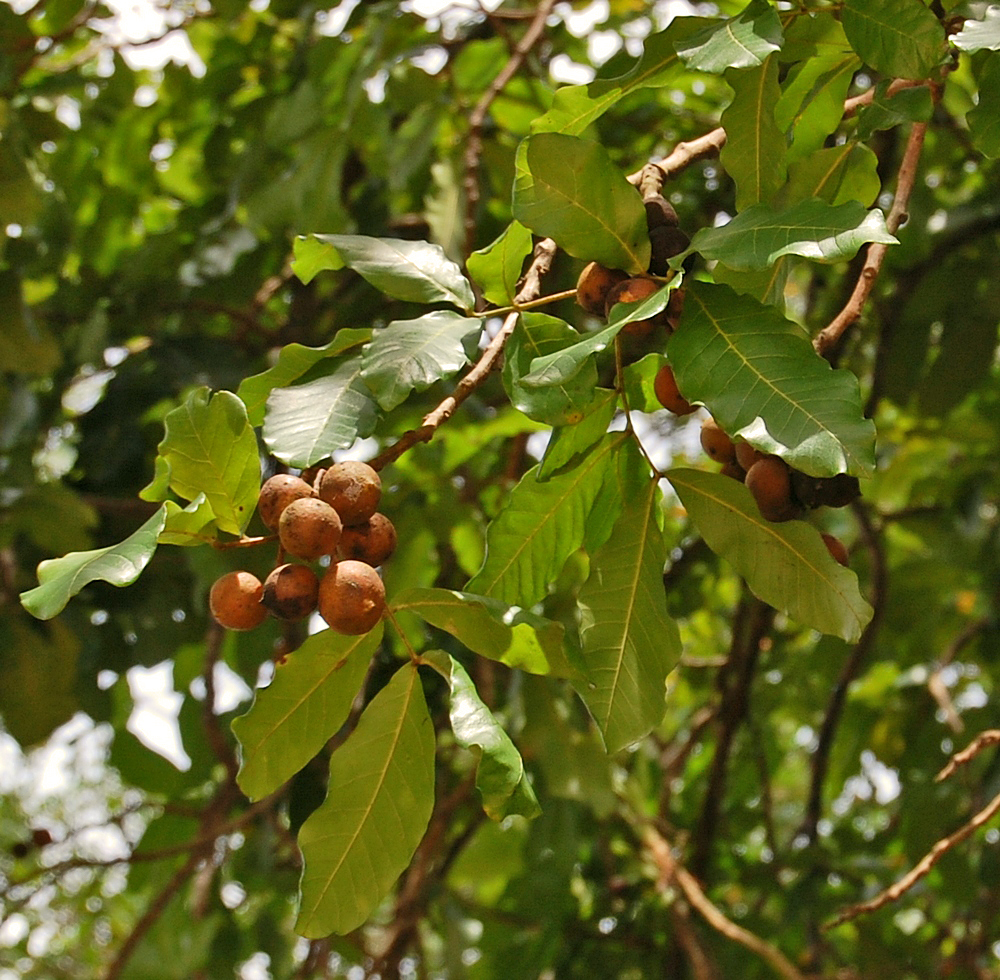
Fruits of the Kusum tree

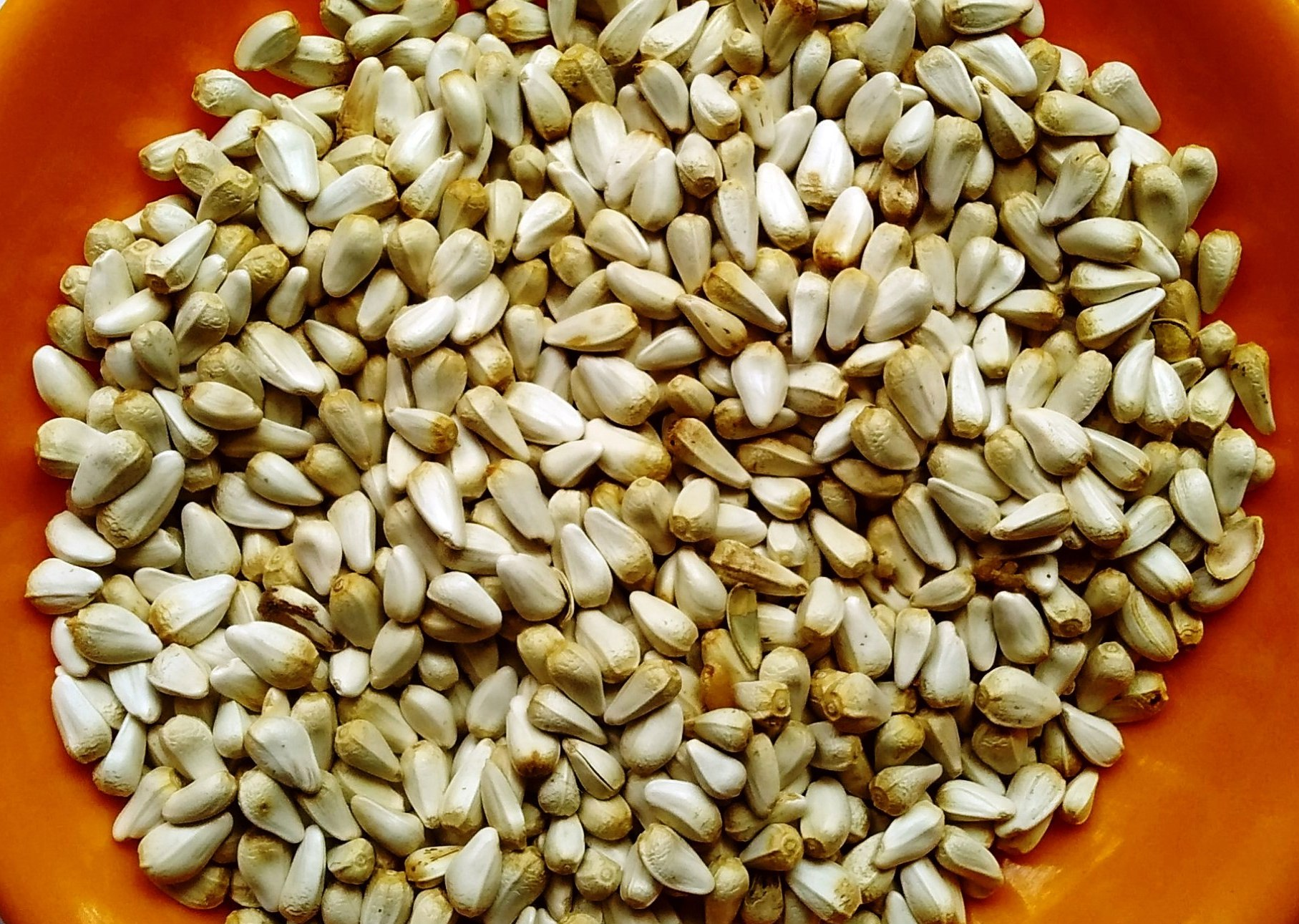
Seeds of the Kusum fruits

Kusum oil is a type of oil extracted from the seed of the Kusum tree (Schleichera oleosa). The plant, which is also commonly known as Ceylon oak, lac tree, or Macassar oiltree, belongs to the family Sapindaceae. The genus is named after J. C. Schleicher, a Swiss botanist, and the species name means "oily" or "rich in oil." The tree is native to South Asia, but is also found in some parts of Southeast Asia.

== Collection of seeds ==
The bunches of fruit are plucked by climbing the Schleichera oleosa trees. The fruit pulp is removed by rubbing the fruits in water, and letting them dry.

== Oil ==
The oil contains oleic acid (2-3%), stearic acid (2-6%), gadoleic acid, and arachidic acid as well as cyanogenic compounds, which must be removed for human consumption. Kusum oil is unusual, with just 37% of common glycerol esters. The oil also contains linoleic acid (43-50%), palmitic acid (5-8%), and hydrocyanic acid, which is poisonous and must also be removed prior to consumption. The oil is yellowish brown, semi-solid, with the faint odour of bitter almond. When allowed to settle, a light coloured solid fat separates. Kusum oil contains a cyanogenic compound in concentration of 0.03-0.05% as HCN. But the exact location of the cyanogenic compound in the oil or its nature has not been reported.

Property	Value
Moisture and insoluble impurities	0.25
Refractive Index at 50 °C	4.4560-1.460
Specific gravityat 90°/30 °C	0.865-0.869
Saponification value	220-240
Iodine value(Wijs)	48-60
Acid value, max	10.0
Unsaponifiable matter% by Wt	3.0
Titer value °C, min	45
Reichert-Meissel value	15-20
Polenske value, max	1.5

Fatty acid composition

Fatty acid	Percent
Myristic acid (C14:0)	0.01
Palmitic acid (C16:0)	7.59
Palmitoleic acid(C16:1)	1.80
Oleic acid (C18:1)	2.83
trans-Linoleic acid (C18:2)	49.69
cis-Linoleic acid (C18:2)	5.56
α-Linolenic acid (C18:3)	0.26
Eicosenoic acid (C20:1)	29.54
Eicosadienoic acid (C20:2)	0.24
Behenic acid (C22:0)	1.14
Erucic acid (C22:1)	1.22
Lignoceric acid (C24:0)	0.03

== Uses ==
Kusum oil is used in hairdressing. The oil can also be used for cooking and lighting, and is used in traditional medicine. It is used as massage oil to relieve pain.

== See also ==
- Schleichera oleosa
- Trees of India
