= Aegyptiacum =

Aegyptiacum, or ægyptiacum, was used in pharmacy as a kind of detersive, or cleansing unguent. It is so called from its dusky hue or color, which resembles the swarthy complexion of the Egyptian people.

It is composed of verdigris, vinegar, and honey, boiled to a consistency.

The prescription is Masawaiyh's. It is chiefly used for eating off rotten flesh and cleaning foul ulcers, particularly venereal ones in the throat, and mouth ulcers.

One of the ingredients in a wound-cleansing plaster made by Henry VIII of England's Surgeon Thomas Gale in his handbook, Certaine Workes of Chirurgerie.

"A mundicative

Aegyptiacum Unguent 2 ounces

Alum 1 ounce

Frankincense 1/2 ounce

Myrrh 1 dram

Red Wine 2 pounds

Boil"
