= Antimacassar =

Small cloth placed over the backs of furniture

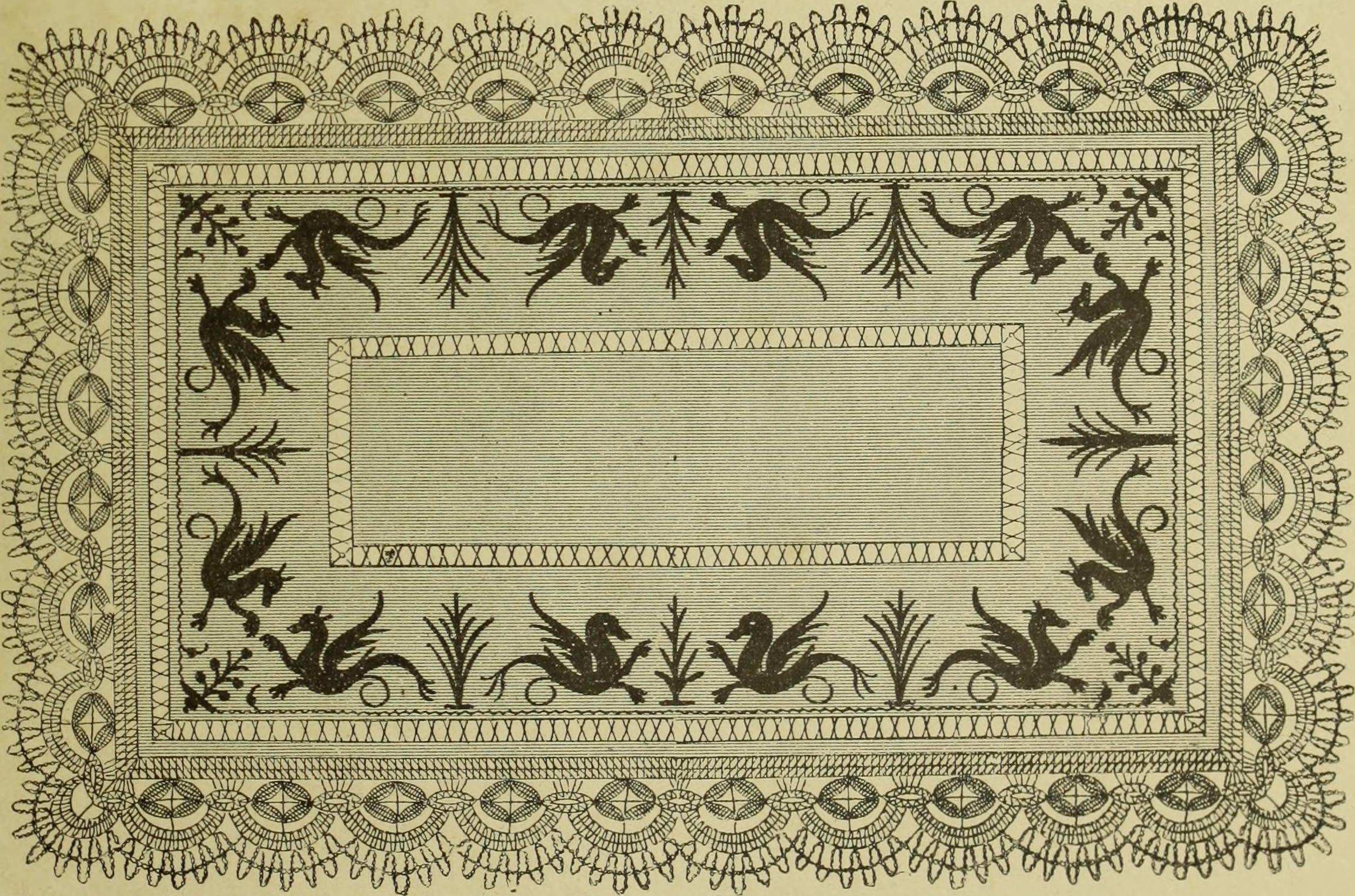
Design of a cloth antimacassar

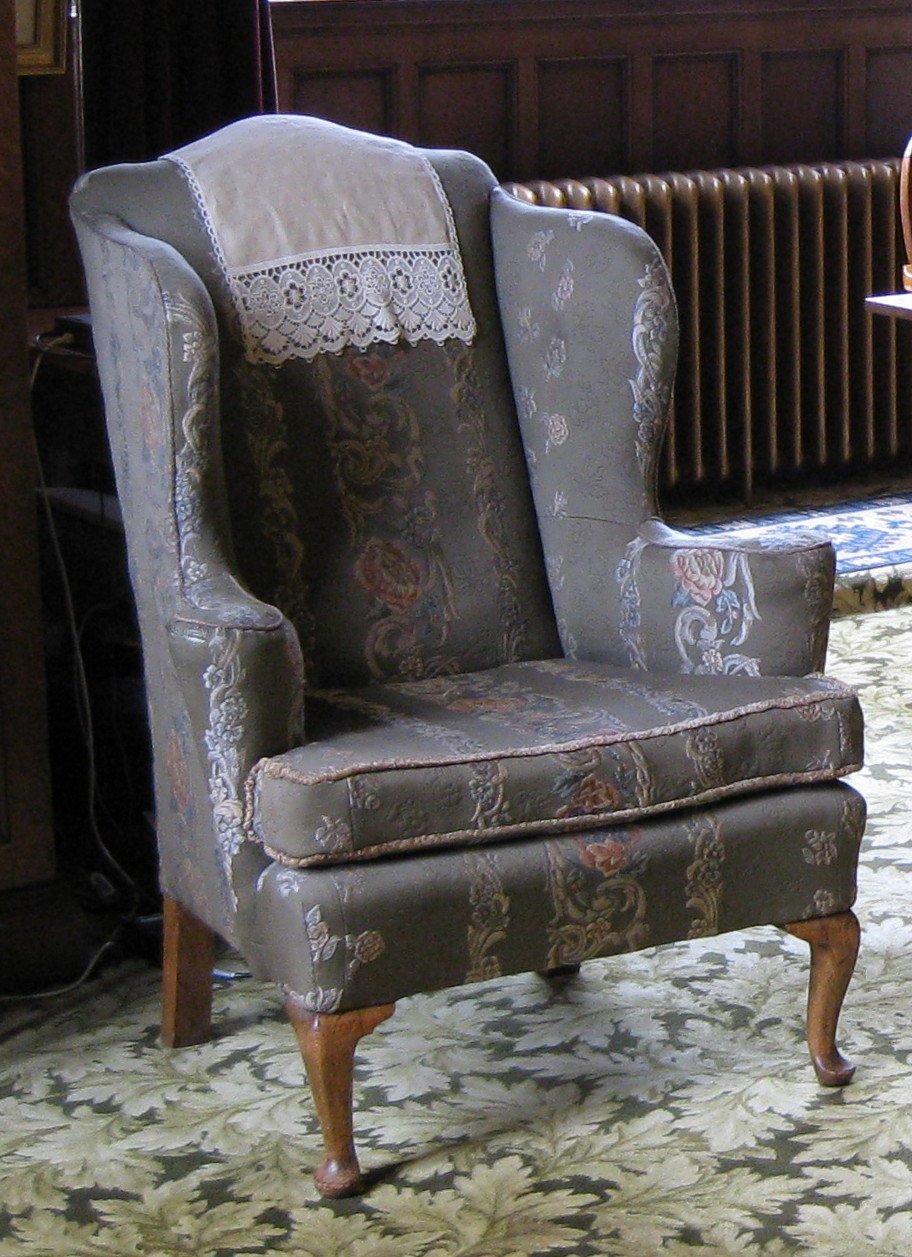
Armchair with antimacassar-Sheffield Mayors Parlour

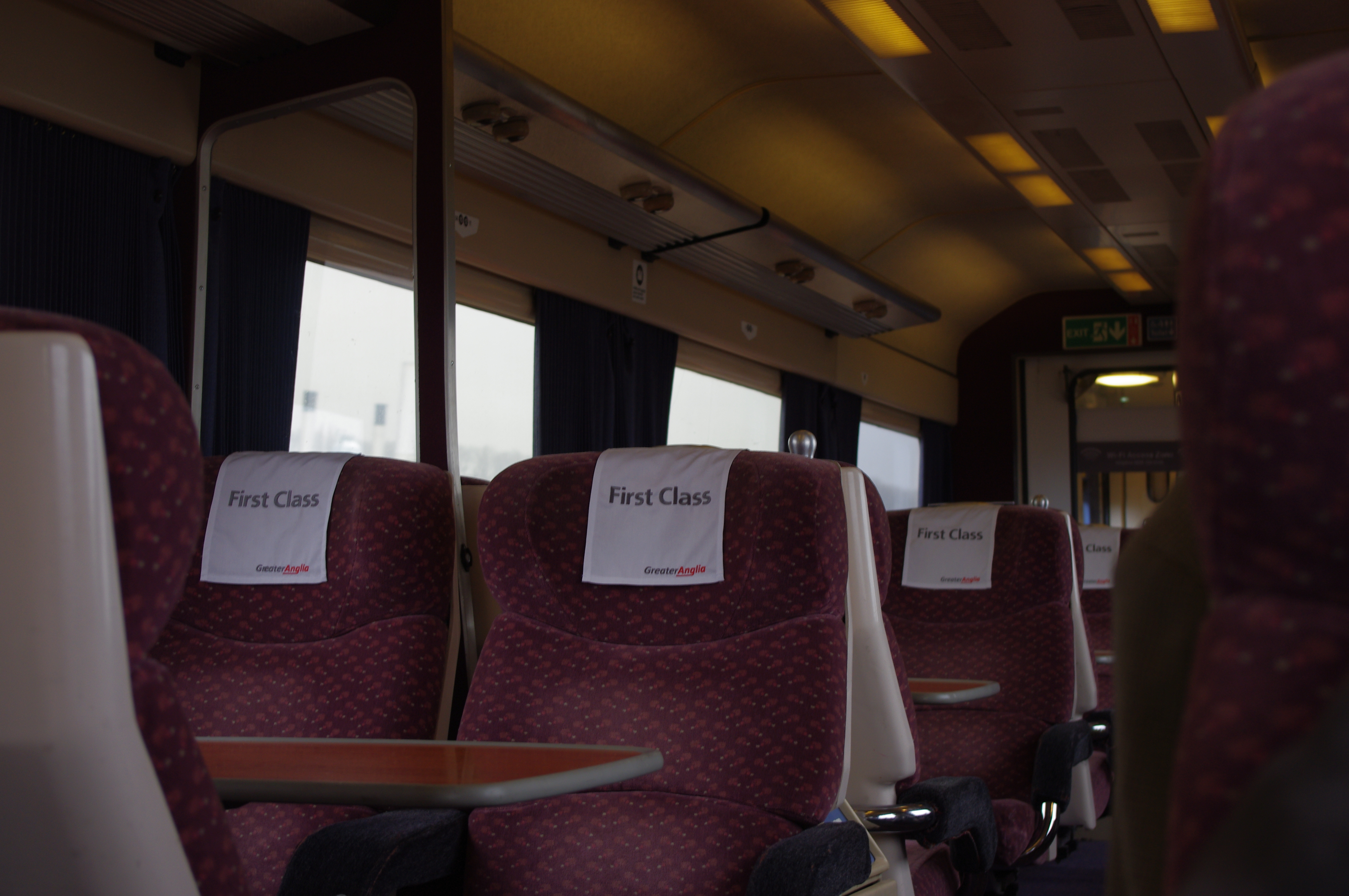
Antimacassars on rail carriage seats

An antimacassar /ˌæntɪməˈkæsər/ is a small cloth placed over the backs or arms of chairs, or the head or cushions of a sofa, to prevent soiling of the permanent fabric underneath. The name also refers to the cloth flap 'collar' on a sailor's shirt or top, used to keep macassar oil off the uniform.

== History ==
Macassar oil was an unguent for the hair commonly used by men in the early 19th century and reputed to have been manufactured from ingredients purchased in the port of Makassar in the Dutch East Indies. The poet Byron called it "thine incomparable oil, Macassar". The fashion for oiled hair became so widespread in the Victorian and the Edwardian period that housewives began to cover the arms and backs of their chairs with washable cloths to prevent the fabric coverings from being soiled. Around 1850, these started to be known as antimacassars. They were also installed in theatres from 1865.

They came to have elaborate patterns, often in matching sets for the various items of parlor furniture; they were either made at home using a variety of techniques such as crochet or tatting or purchased. The original antimacassars were usually made of stiff white crochet-work.

In the third quarter of the 19th century, they became simpler and softer, usually fabric embroidered with a simple pattern in wool or silk.

By the beginning of the 20th century, antimacassars had become so associated in people's minds with the Victorian period that the word briefly became a figurative term for it. For example, antimacassars are suggestive of old-fashioned, Victorian-era women in Rebecca West's novel The Return of the Soldier.

Antimacassars are also used on the seat headrests of commercial passenger transport vehicles, such as trains, buses and, especially, aircraft, to prevent the transmission of hair dressings and medical conditions between passengers, simplify maintenance, and extend the life of fabrics.
