= Macassar oil =

Compound oil used for hair grooming

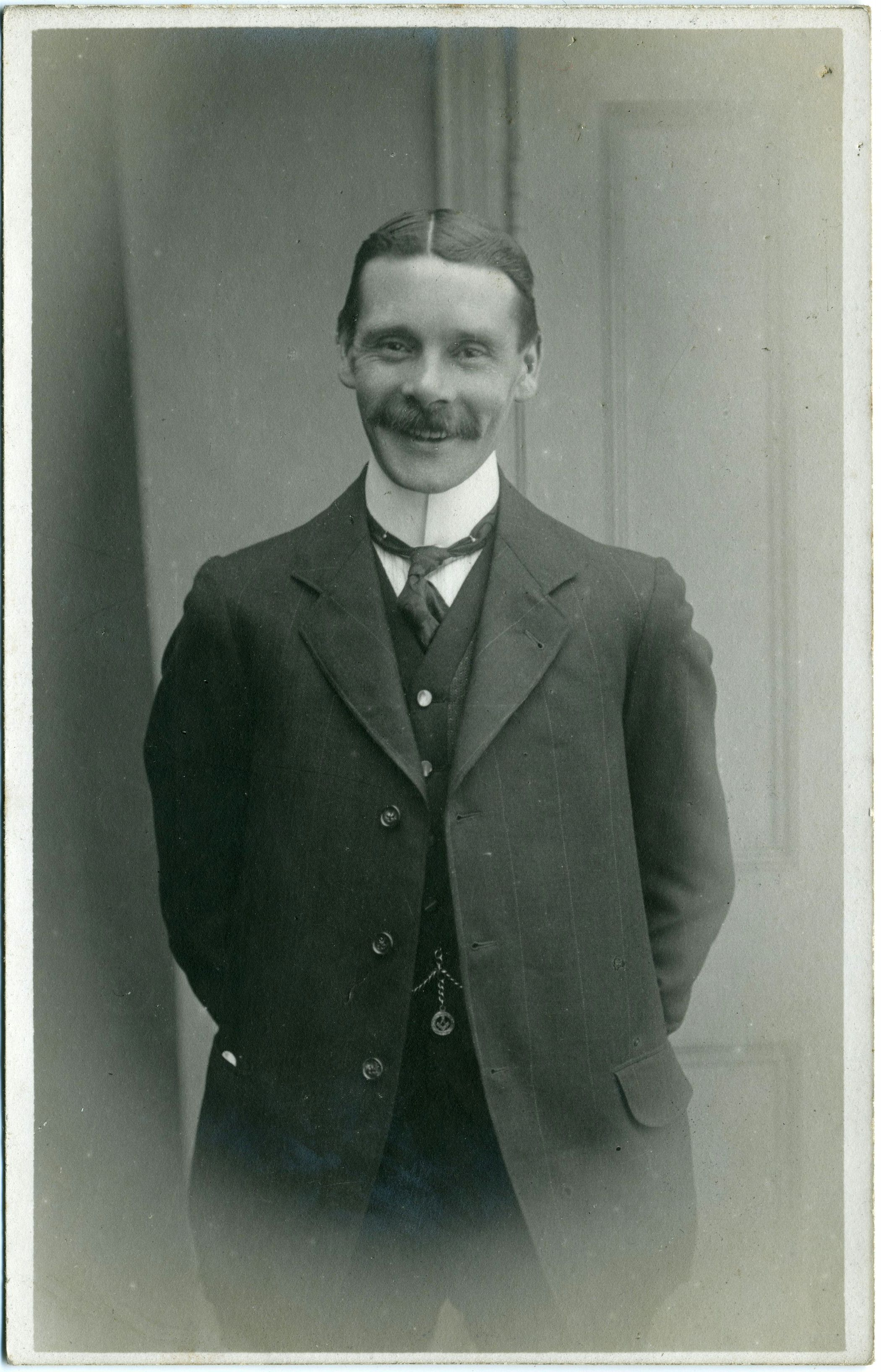
A young man in Herne Bay, Kent, England, around 1903 to 1914, showing hair groomed with Macassar oil

Macassar oil is an oil that was originally compounded from Macassar ebony oil that was used primarily by Western European men throughout the 1800s and early 1900s as a hair conditioner to groom and style the hair.

== History ==
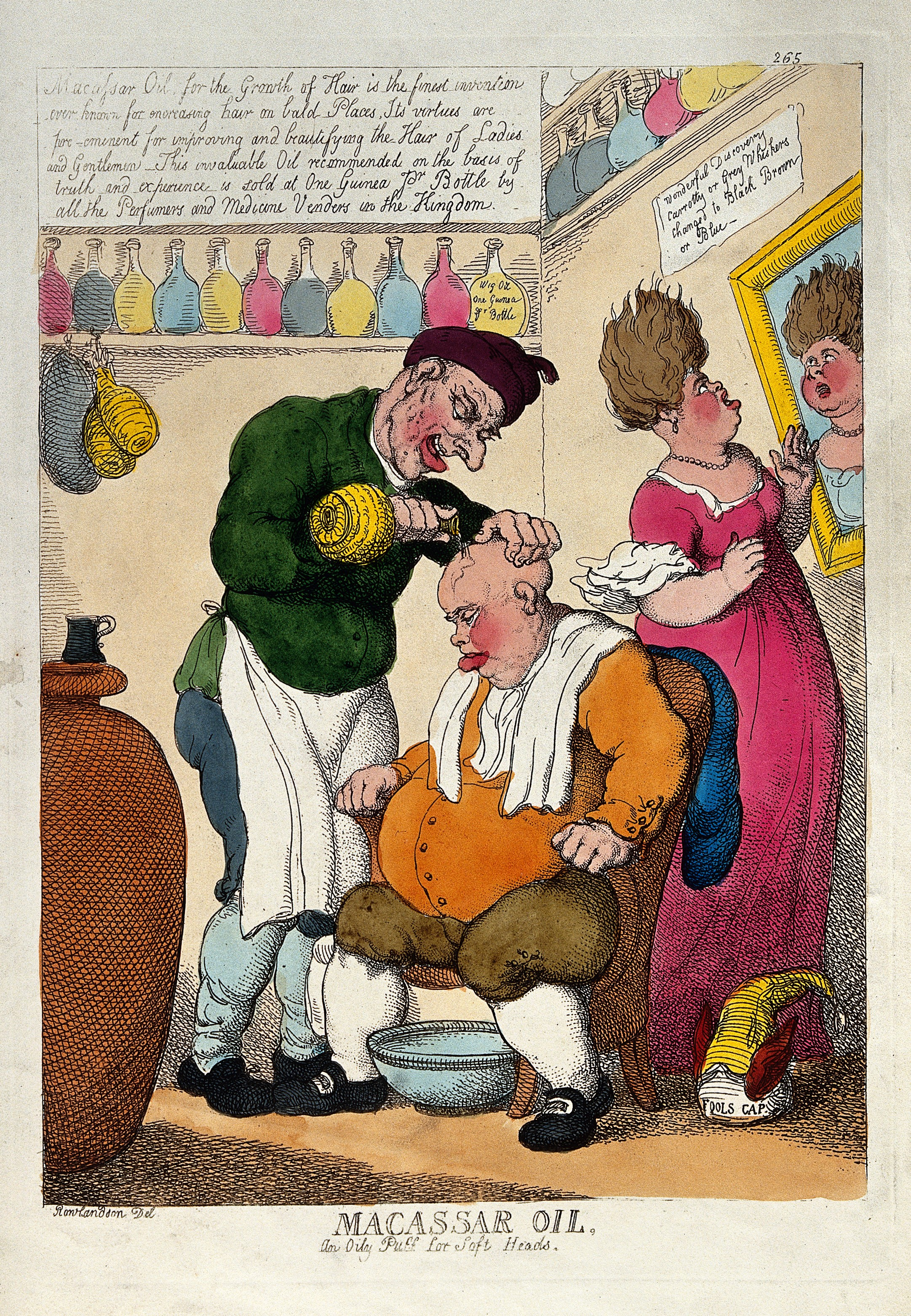
Illustration by Thomas Rowlandson from around 1814 making fun of the false claim in some advertisements that Macassar oil would stimulate hair growth on balding men

It was popularised by Alexander Rowland (1747–1823), a celebrated London barber. It was then not uncommon for barbers to make their own hair preparations and around 1793 Rowland began offering Rowland's Macassar Oil. Within two decades it had become hugely popular and was aggressively advertised with extravagant claims of its effectiveness, becoming one of the first nationally advertised products.

The words Macassar Oil were registered as a trademark by A. Rowland & Sons in 1888. Rowland's son (also named Alexander) later stated that a relative living in the island of Celebes in the Dutch East Indies had helped in procurement of the basic ingredient.

Although it was originally made with Schleichera oleosa oil (known as kayu hitam where it is still used in Indonesia), due to the difficulty of obtaining it, as a result of the decline in the availability of the tree (as the result of being overharvested for lumber), it was increasingly made with vegetable oils, such as coconut, palm or Kusum oil, combined with fragrant oils such as ylang-ylang.

Macassar oil was so named because it was reputed to have been manufactured from ingredients purchased in the port of Makassar in the Dutch East Indies. The poet Byron facetiously called it "thine incomparable oil, Macassar" in the first canto of Don Juan, and Lewis Carroll also mentions "Rowland's Macassar Oil" in the poem "Haddocks' Eyes" from Through the Looking-Glass.

Due to the tendency for the oil to transfer from the user's hair to the back of his chair, the antimacassar was developed. This is a small washable cloth (crocheted, embroidered or mass-produced), placed over the back of a chair to protect the upholstery.

== See also ==
- Brilliantine
- Brylcreem
- Pomade
