= Polenske value =

The Polenske value (also known as the Polenske number) is a value determined when examining fat. It is an indicator of how much volatile fatty acid can be extracted from fat through saponification. It is equal to the number of milliliters of 0.1 normal alkali solution necessary for the neutralization of the water-insoluble volatile fatty acids distilled and filtered from 5 grams of a given saponified fat. (The hydroxide solution used in such a titration is typically made from sodium hydroxide, potassium hydroxide, or barium hydroxide.) It is measure of the steam volatile and water insoluble fatty acids, chiefly caprylic, capric and lauric acids, present in oil and fat. The value is named for the chemist who developed it, Eduard Polenske.

The Reichert value and Kirschner value are related numbers based on similar tests.
