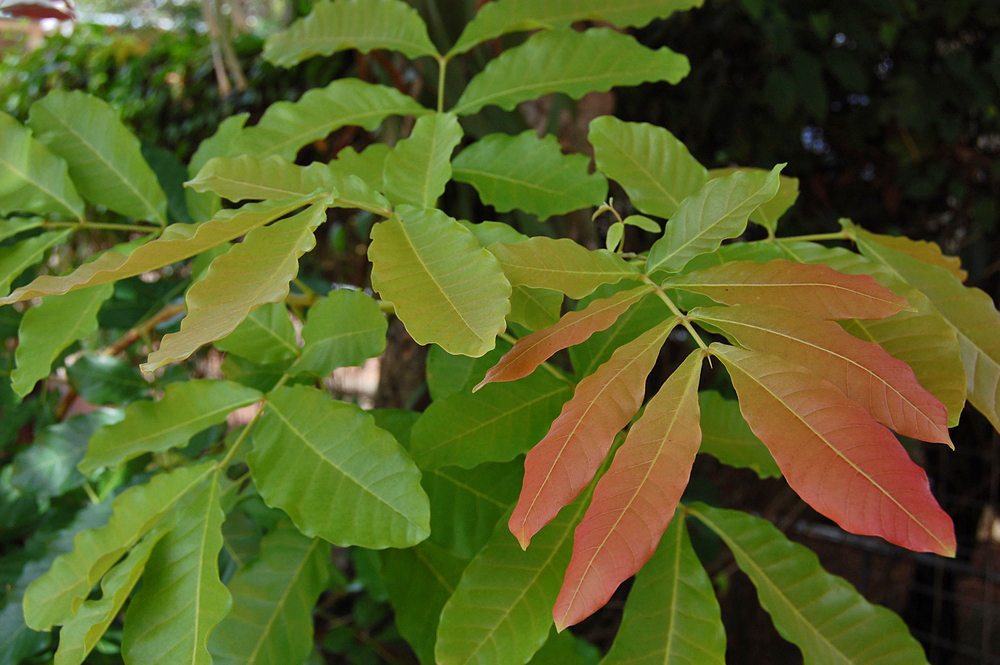
- Young leaves

Conservation status
- Least Concern (IUCN 3.1)

Scientific classification
- Kingdom: Plantae
- Clade: Tracheophytes
- Clade: Angiosperms
- Clade: Eudicots
- Clade: Rosids
- Order: Sapindales
- Family: Sapindaceae
- Subfamily: Sapindoideae
- Genus: Schleichera; Lour.
- Species: S. oleosa

Binomial name
- Schleichera oleosa (Lour.) Oken

Synonyms
- 18 synonyms: Homotypic synonyms; **Pistacia oleosa Lour. **Koon oleosus (Lour.) Pierre **Cussambium oleosum (Lour.) Kuntze: Heterotypic Synonyms; **Conghas zeylonensis Wall. **Cussambium glabrum Buch.-Ham. **Cussambium pubescens Buch.-Ham. **Cussambium spinosum Buch.-Ham. **Melicoccus pubescens (B.Heyne ex Roth) DC. **Melicoccus trijuga (Willd.) Juss. **Ornitrophe triandra Blanco **Schleichera aculeata Kostel. **Schleichera pubescens B.Heyne ex Roth **Schleichera trijuga Willd. **Schleichera trijuga var. extensa Pierre **Schmidelia triandra Blanco **Scytalia trijuga (Willd.) Roxb. ex DC. **Stadtmannia pubescens Spreng. **Stadtmannia trijuga (Willd.) Spreng.

= Schleichera =

Genus of trees

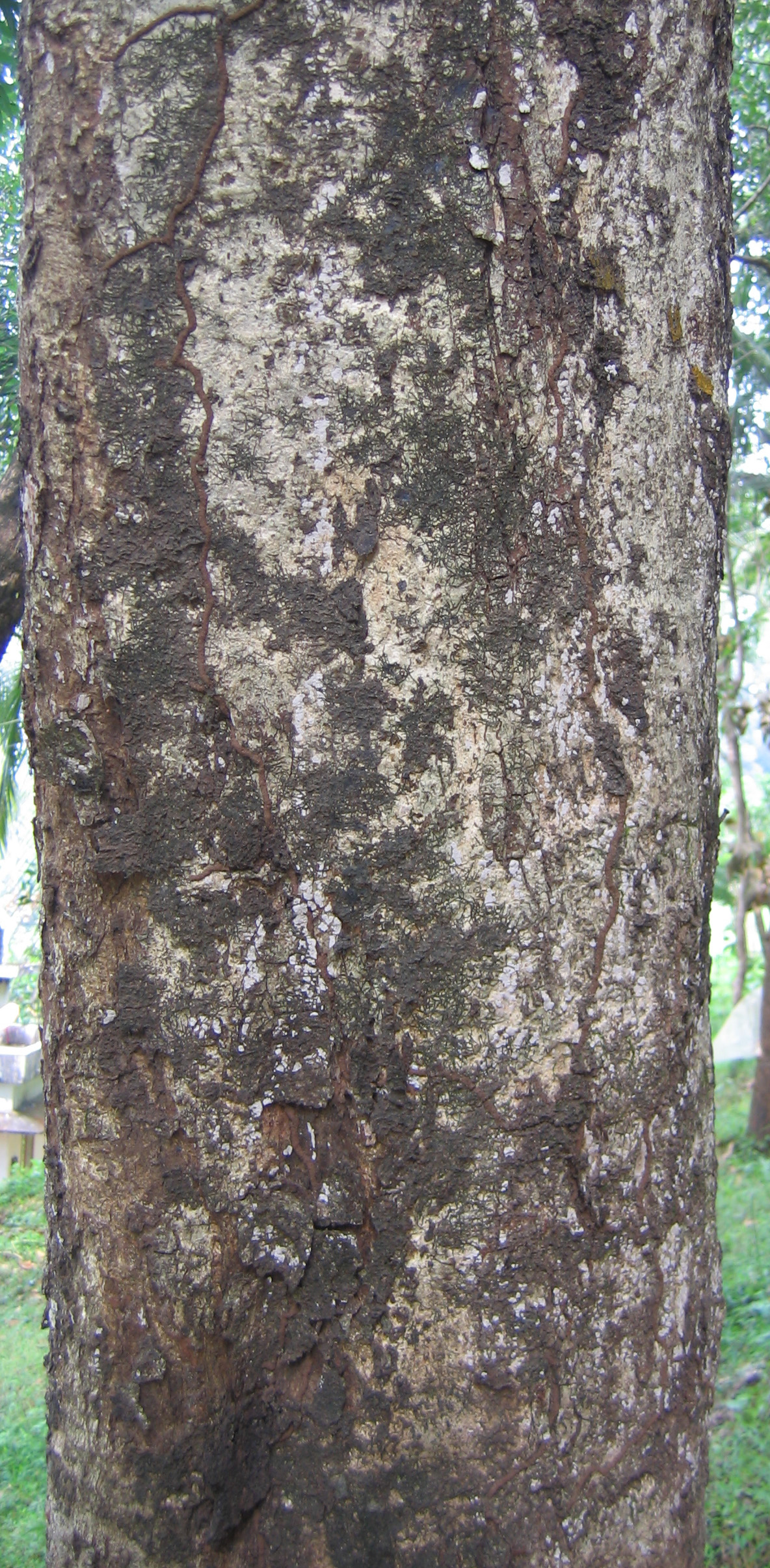
Bark

Schleichera is a monotypic genus of plants in the soapberry family, Sapindaceae. There is only one species, Schleichera oleosa. This tree occurs in the Indian subcontinent and Southeast Asia.

== Species ==
Schleichera oleosa, kusum tree, Ceylon oak, lac tree, gum lac tree. It is a large deciduous (nearly evergreen) tree with a comparatively short fluted trunk and a shade spreading crown. It is frost and drought hardy and is subject to damage by grazing. It produces root-suckers freely, and it has good cropping power. The wood is very hard and reddish brown. This tree is noted for its growth of new leaves that are bright red. In India the growth of these bright red leaves happens around March.

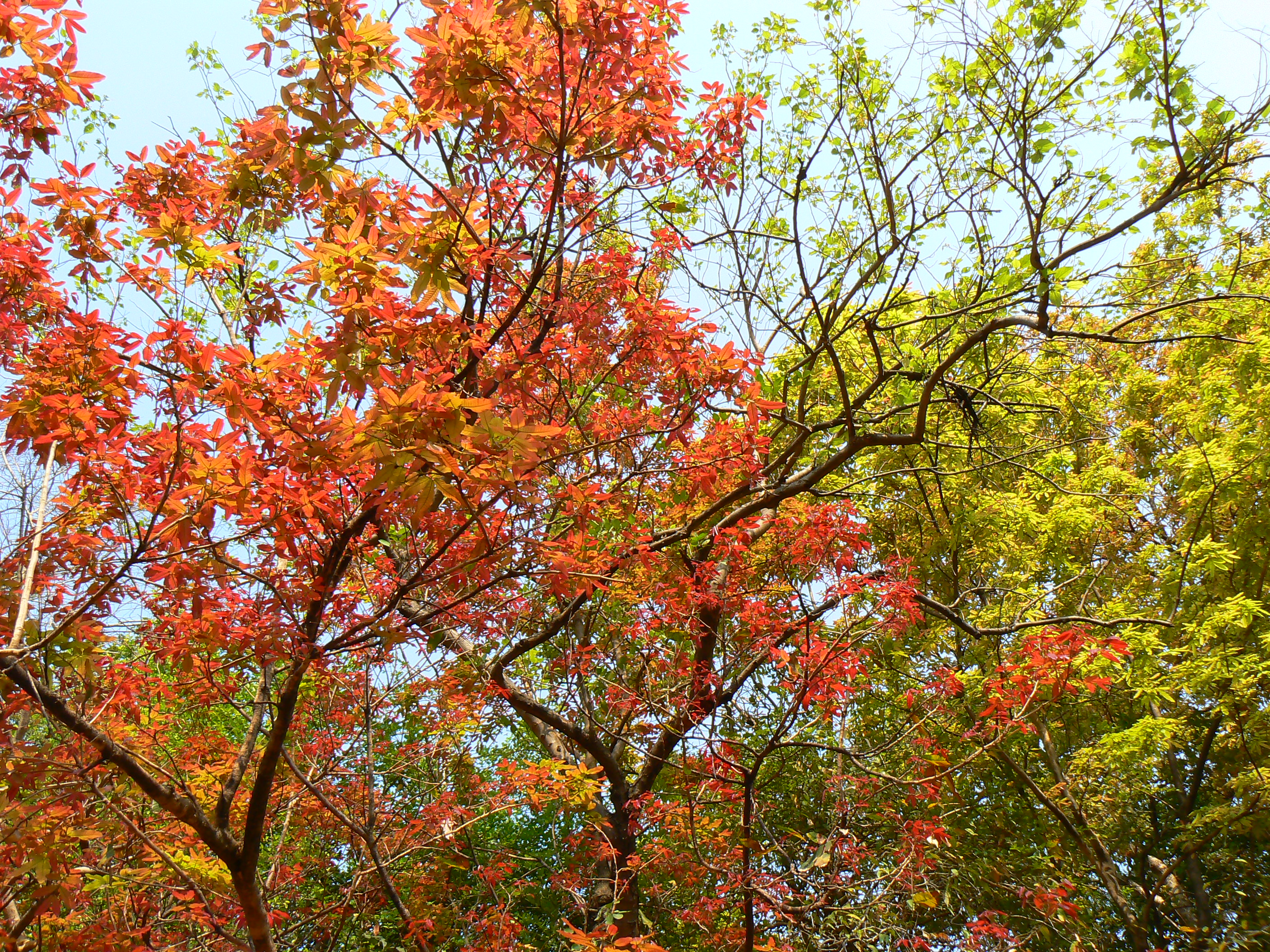
Young leaves blooming in various shades of red

The leaves are pinnate, with each leaf having 2-4 leaflets. The tree is host to Kusumi Lac (Kerria lacca), a lac insect which is native to India. Its seeds are the source of Kusum oil.

Flowers: The flowers are tiny and hardly noticeable, occurring in short dense yellow clusters.

Fruit: The fruit is 2.5 to 3 cm long - roughly the size of a small plum - and ovoid, 1-3 celled, and more or less abruptly tapering to a point, dry indehiscent.

Seed: The seed is 1.5 cm long, smooth, brown, and enclosed in a succulent aril which has an acidic taste, and contains 25-38% oil and up to 22% protein. It is irregular or ellipsoidal in shape, slightly compressed, and has a thick brown seed coat on its surface. The moisture in the dried seed should be maintained around 4-6%.

Kernel: The kernel is 16-20% of the dried fruit and 60-64% of the seed. It is 51-52% oil. The kernel is susceptible to fungal attack.

== Distribution ==
It is native to the Andaman Islands, Assam, Bangladesh, Cambodia, India, Java, Laos, the Lesser Sunda Islands, the Maluku Islands, Myanmar, Nepal, Sri Lanka, Sulawesi, Thailand, and Vietnam.

== Habitat ==
This tree grows naturally from the foothills of the Himalayas and the western Deccan Plateau, east to Sri Lanka and Southeast Asia. It grows in Bihar, Central and Southern parts of India. The tree occurs sporadically, seldom gregariously in dry, mixed deciduous forests. It grows in rocky, gravelly, or loamy, slightly acidic soil that is well drained. It is occasionally found in swampy locations, but it usually grows on rather dry soil, at low altitudes, but can be found at 900–1200 meters. The requirement of normal rain fall is 750–2800 mm. and ambient temperature of 35-47.5 °C.

== Names ==
In Thailand this tree is known as takhro (Thai: ตะคร้อ) or as kho (Thai: ค้อ), the latter being a name that it shares with Livistona speciosa, a kind of palm tree. The German-Dutch botanist Georg Eberhard Rumphius, who lived for 45 years in Ambon, called this tree Cussambium.

In India it is mostly known as Kusum (कुसुम) and was one of the main trees of undisturbed forests in Madhya Pradesh and the Deccan Plateau. In Sri Lanka it is known as koan (කෝන්).

== Pests ==
The tree is a host of the lac bug Kerria lacca, whose female secretes a resin known as shellac to form a tunnel-like tube as it traverses the branches of the tree. A variety of trees are able to host the insect, but the resin produced on the Schleichera tree is least colored.

== Gallery ==
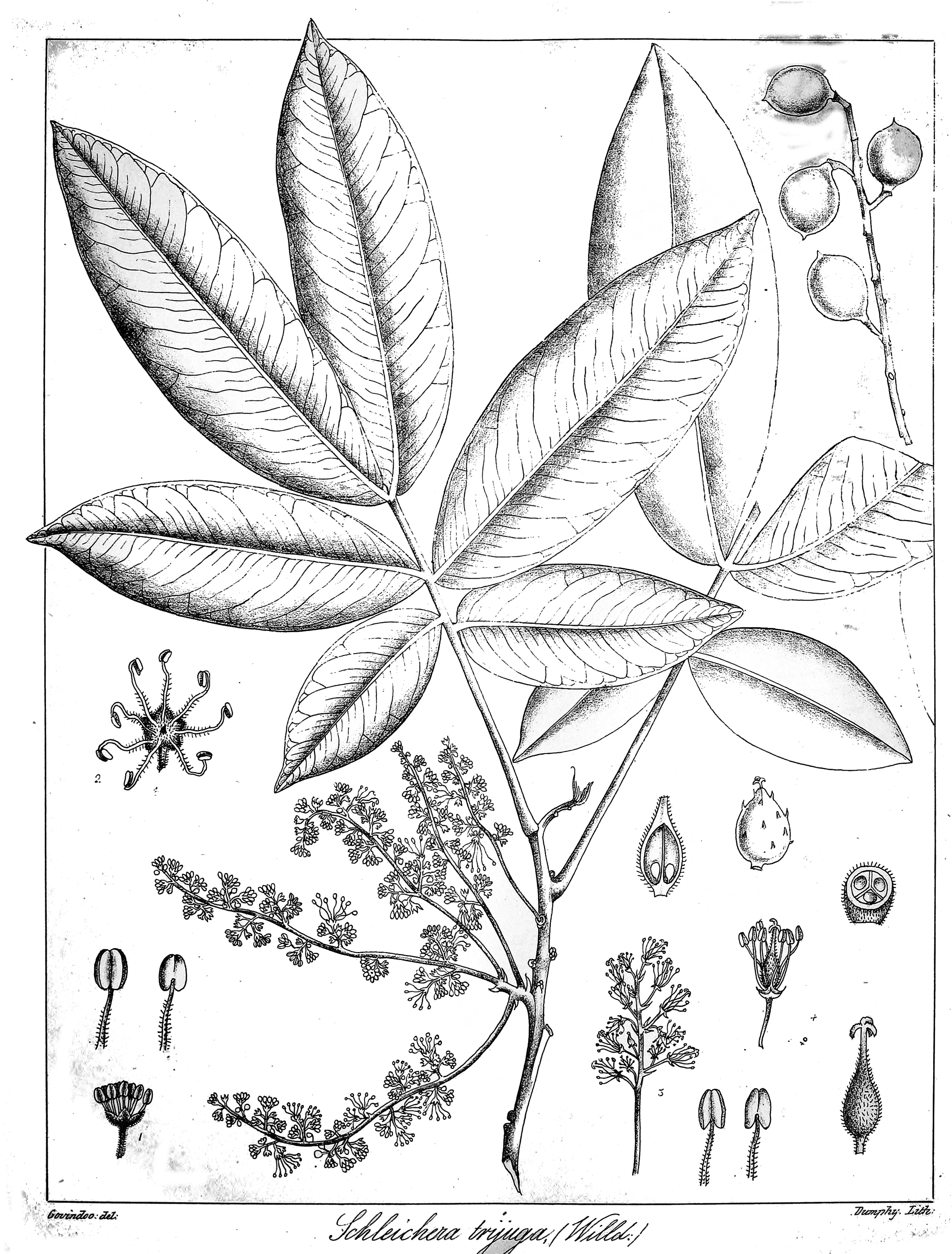

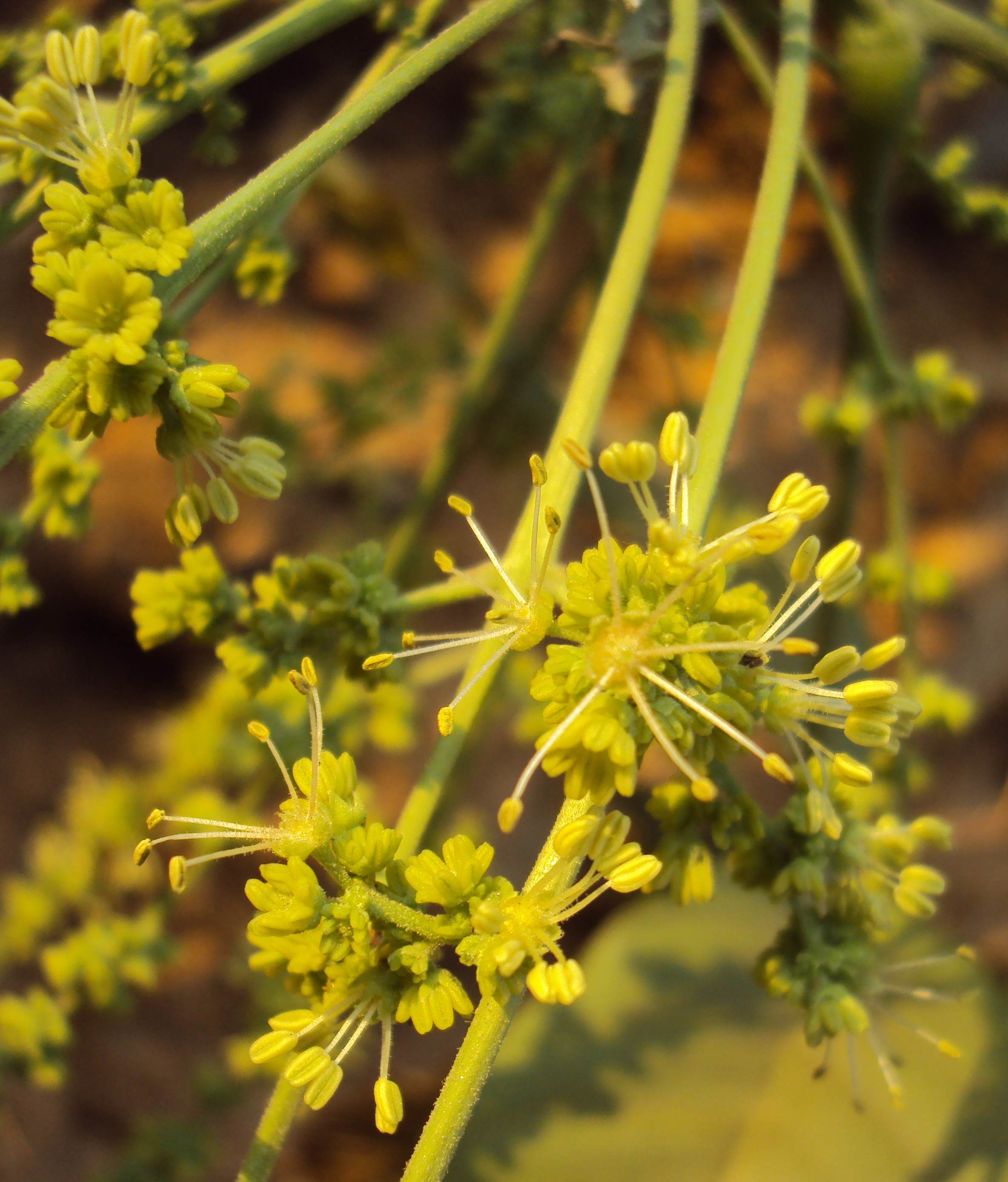
Flowers

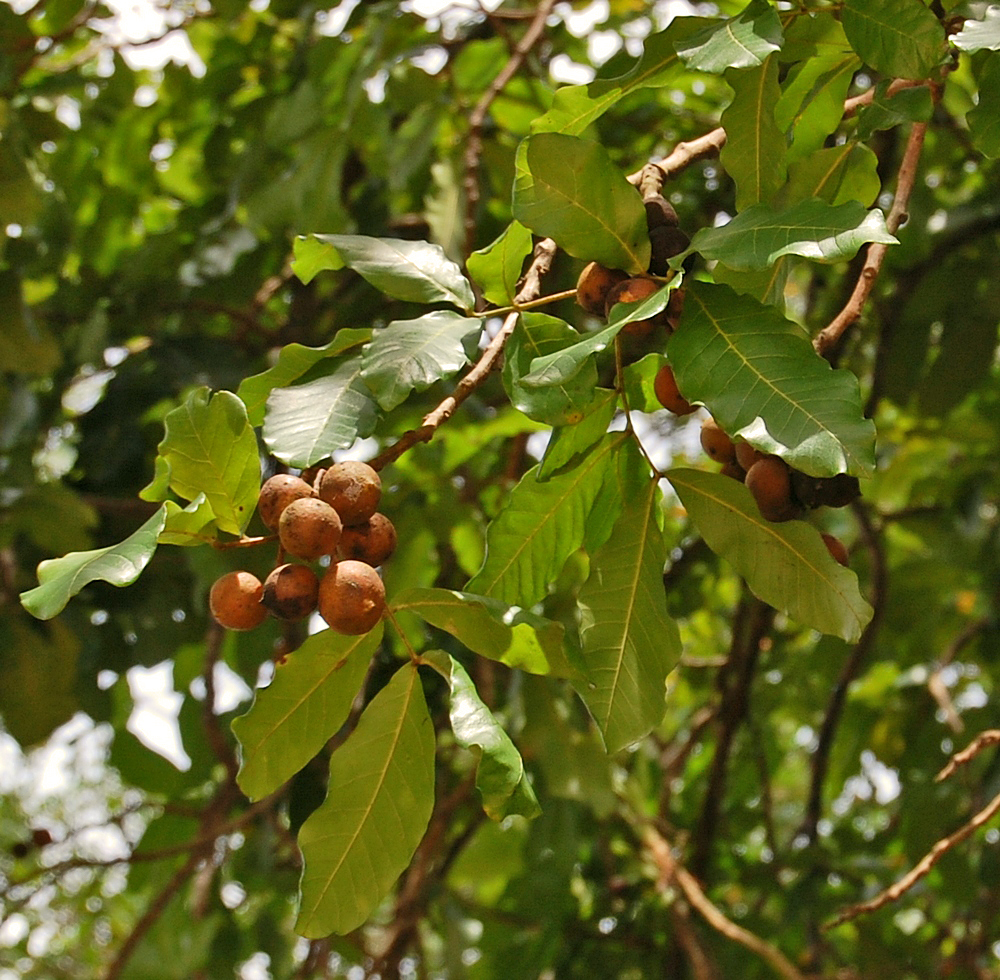
Fruits

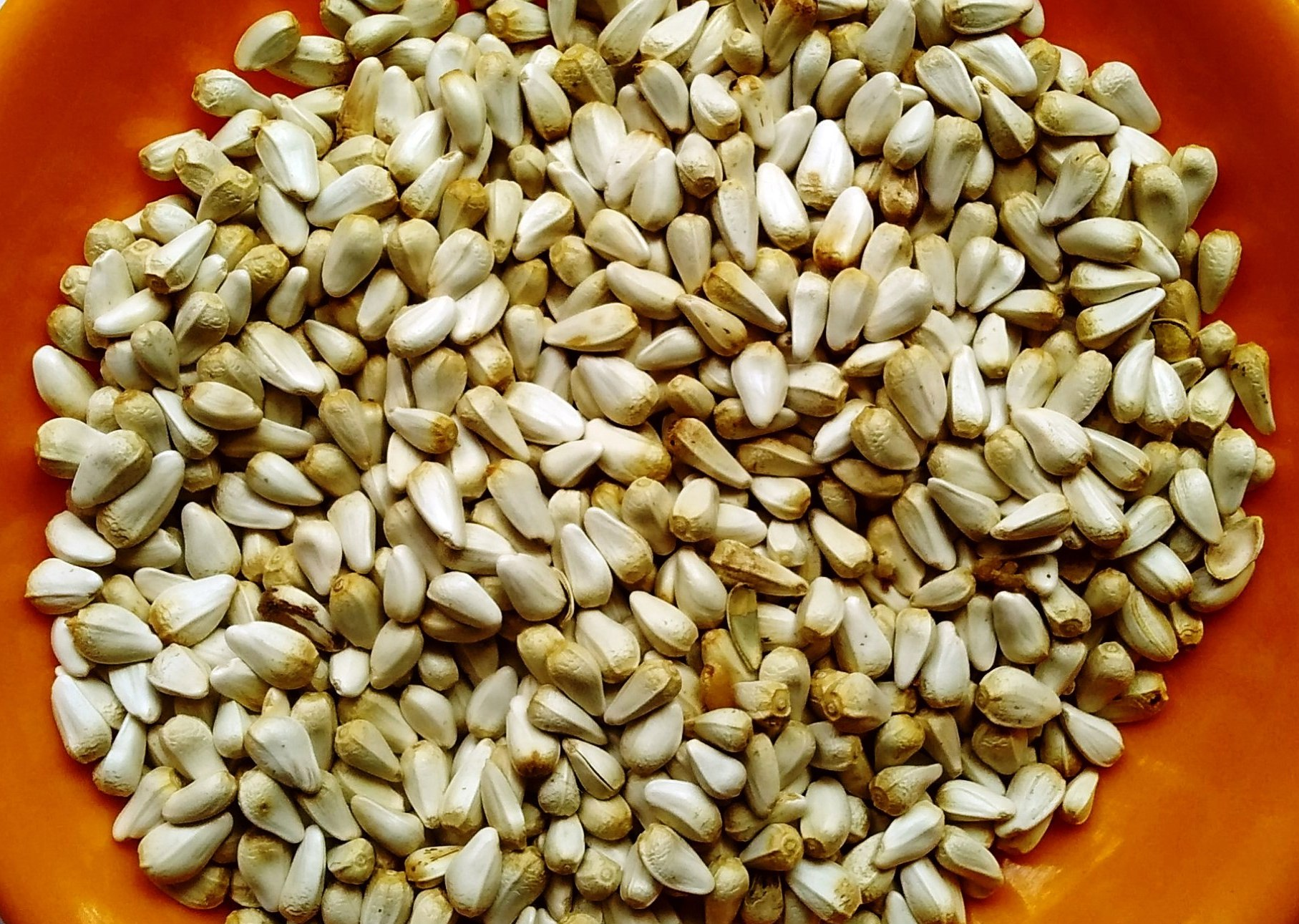
Seeds

== See also ==
- Kusum oil
- Macassar oil
