= 1960s in fashion =

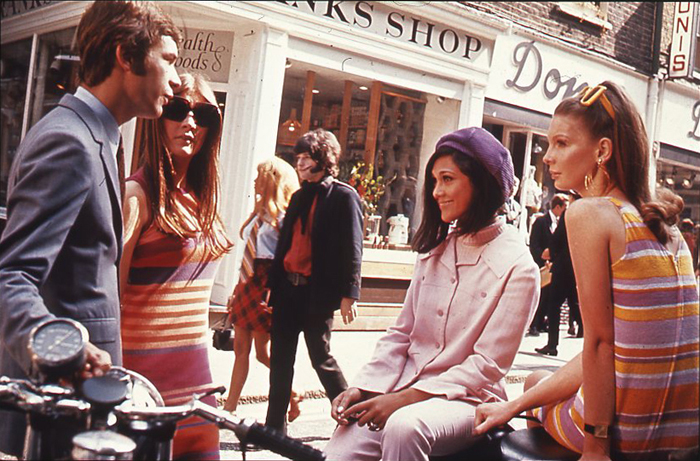
"Swinging London" fashions on Carnaby Street, 1966. The National Archives (United Kingdom).

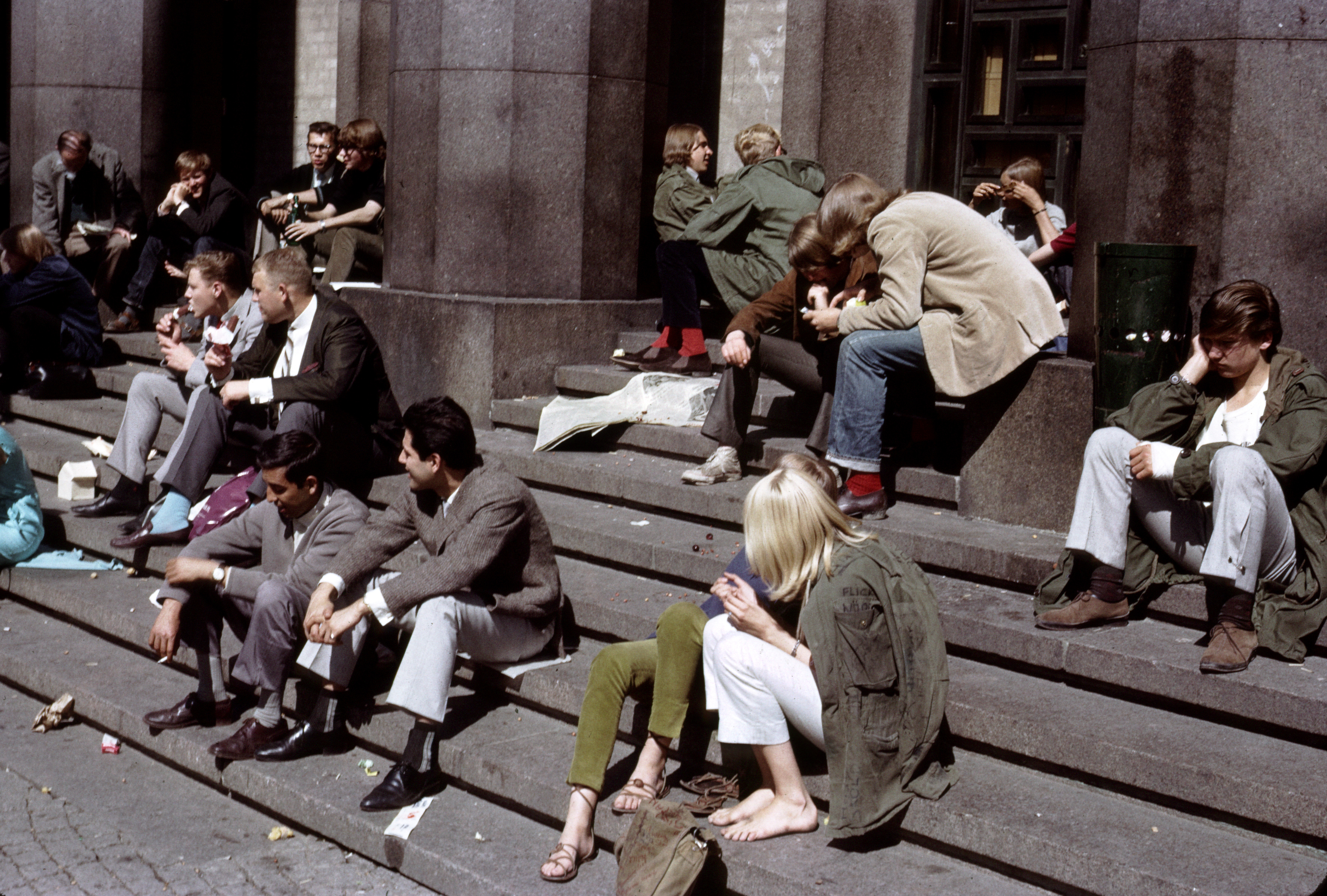
Swedish beatniks in Stockholm, 1965

Fashion in the 1960s reflected changing social attitudes and the growing influence of youth culture. By the middle of the decade, styles emerging from youth subcultures, particularly in London, had begun to influence both high-end designer fashion and mass-market clothing. Examples included the miniskirt, culottes, go-go boots, alongside more experimental designs made from synthetic materials such as polyvinyl chloride (PVC).

Designer Mary Quant helped popularize the miniskirt, while Jacqueline Kennedy contributed to the popularity of the pillbox hat; notably wearing one at President John F. Kennedy's inauguration in 1961. False eyelashes became a feature of women's makeup, while longer hairstyles gained popularity toward the end of the decade. Bright colors and bold patterns were also fashionable, with psychedelic prints becoming associated with the counterculture of the late 1960s.

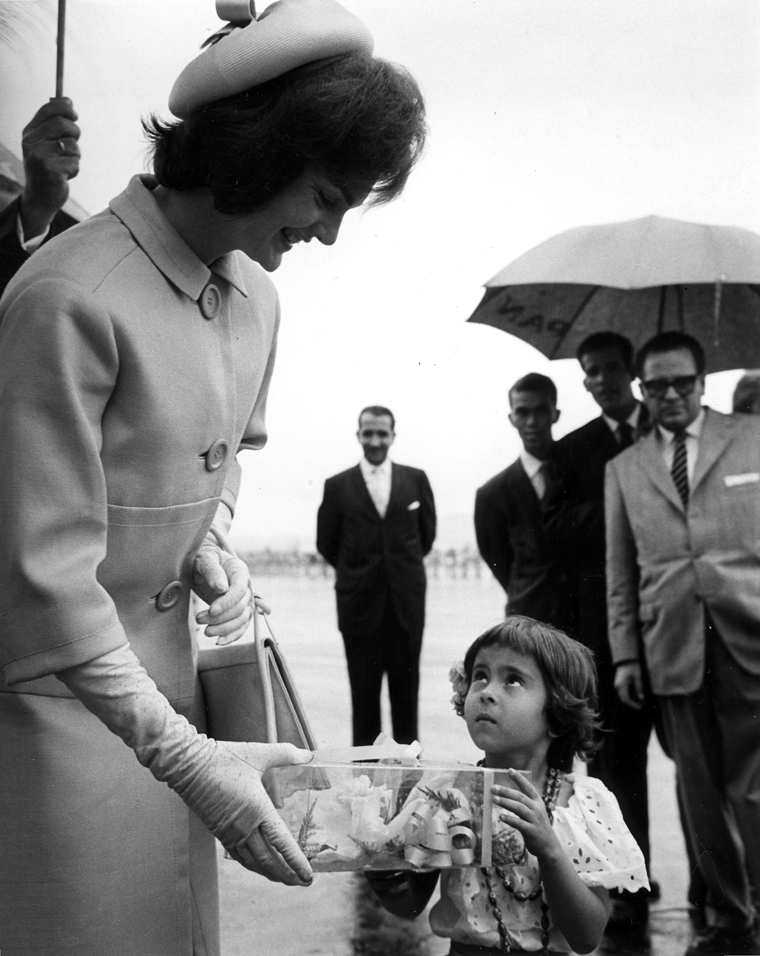
US First Lady Jacqueline Kennedy arrives in Venezuela, 1961

During the early and mid-1960s, the Mod subculture, which emerged in London in the late 1950s, influenced men's fashion in Britain. Mods favored tailored suits, narrow trousers, and styles influenced by Italian fashion. The post-World War II Baby boom led to a large teenage demographic, which helped sway the fashion of the time, with boutiques becoming important outlets for new styles. By the late 1960s, the hippie movement had influenced clothing styles, including bell-bottom jeans, tie-dye and batik fabrics, and paisley patterns.

== Women's fashion ==
=== Early 1960s (1960–1963) ===
==== High fashion ====
The high fashion of the early years of the decade continued trends of the late 1950s, as reflected in the elegance of the First Lady of the United States, Jacqueline Kennedy, who was a longtime habitué of Paris couture, particularly Givenchy, even being offered a position at French Vogue magazine during the 1950s. In addition to tailored skirts, women wore tapered-toe, stiletto heel pumps, now often with lower heels and squared toe tips, gloves in various lengths, various styles of hats, bouffant hairstyles, and well-tailored suits with short boxy jackets and oversized buttons, as well as Chanel-inspired cardigan suits. Simple, knee-length geometric dresses, known as shifts, were also in style. For eveningwear, regal-looking full-skirted or columnar evening dresses in sumptuous fabrics of substantial weight were worn, brocades, damasks, cloqués, as well as extensive chiffon; these often had low necklines or boatnecks and close-fitting waists. With their eveningwear, women would wear evening gloves, mainly white or black, also following the fashion of Jacqueline Kennedy, who patronized and got her ideas from the top French and US couturiers.

==== The rise of trousers for women ====
- The 1960s were an age of fashion innovation for women. The early 1960s gave birth to drainpipe jeans and capri pants, a style popularized by Audrey Hepburn. Casual dress became more unisex and often consisted of plaid button-down shirts worn with slim blue jeans, comfortable slacks, or skirts. Traditionally, trousers had been viewed by western society as masculine, but by the early 1960s, it had become acceptable for women to wear them every day. These included Levi Strauss jeans, previously considered blue-collar wear, and "stretch" drainpipe jeans with elastane. Women's trousers came in a variety of styles: narrow, wide, below the knee, above the ankle, and eventually mid-thigh. Mid-thigh cut trousers, also known as shorts, evolved around 1969. By adapting men's style and wearing trousers, women voiced their equality to men.
- In the early 1960s, the formal sartorial standards of the 1950s continued to be the norm, and women were not permitted to wear trousers in public establishments like restaurants and schools or in the workplace, and they were generally not worn on city streets. As in the fifties, they were popular for leisure activities and at-home wear, especially among the young, and designers occasionally presented full palazzo pants for dressier at-home entertaining. The prevalent style was a narrow or tight, high-waisted form, often in stretch fabric, that could reach anywhere from just below the knee to the ankle, with stirrup pants extending the length further and helping maintain a taut line. These were given names like stretch pants or ski pants. In line with the norms of the time, the fabric was of a substantial weight, even in the stretch styles. Denim was occasionally worn but wouldn't yet be at the peaks of popularity it would reach later in the decade. Early sixties shorts were of a similar narrow, fitted shape and ended anywhere from mid-thigh to just above the knee.
- Two designers in particular would begin to make concerted attempts to increase public acceptability of trousers during the early 1960s, Norman Norell and André Courrèges. In 1960, Norell would present his first solo collection, and it would emphasize skirt-looking trousers called culottes as part of formal ensembles suitable for city streets, including culotte suits and culotte dresses. These were knee-length in the style of the time and worn with coordinated hats, gloves, and pumps. His second collection, shown for 1961, would expand trouser wear into evening in styles like chiffon culottes and harem pants that Norell intended to be worn outside the home at dinner parties and formal functions. Courrèges showed his first collection in 1961 and immediately became known for his fine tailoring and well-made trousers, which he intended to be worn in multiple settings and cut long and slim to extend in a clean line onto the top of the foot. His early sixties collections were just harbingers of the influence he would enjoy in the mid-sixties, when he would make trousers a focal point of his revolutionary ideas.

==== Women's boots ====
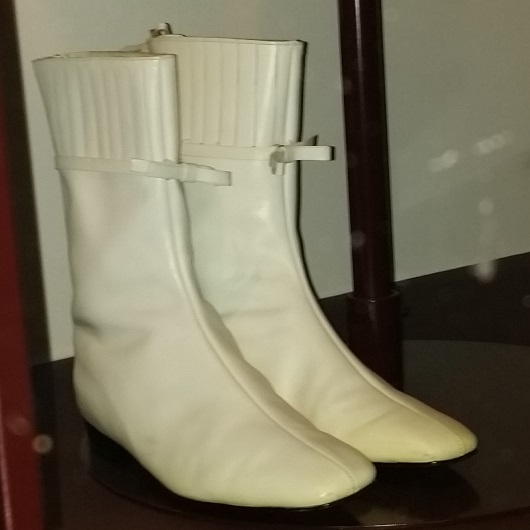
A pair of go-go boots designed by Andre Courreges for his fall 1964 collection

Women's boots began to make an appearance during the early sixties, first with designers but soon with women on the streets. Pumps still dominated by far, but boots were beginning to be accepted as well, the first signs of what would become a norm that would last for at least twenty years. At the end of the fifties, pointy-toed ankle boots had begun to be seen, sharing the pointy-toed, needle-heeled shape of the pumps of the time but extending into a short shaft, and dance clothier Capezio introduced flat, knee-high boots that they called ballet boots. These would increase in popularity in the early 1960s, when flat heels would dominate. In 1962, a range of designers and manufacturers dramatically increased the number of boots offered, with many reaching the knee but including all heights below that as well. Boots for warm weather were presented as well, a trend that would continue into the early 1970s. In 1963, women's boot choices would expand further, with some reaching the thigh, most famously in Roger Vivier's creations for Yves Saint Laurent's fall 1963 collection. Calf-high boots were the most favored at this time, and 1963 would see the debut of André Courrèges's celebrated lower-calf boots, most popular in white, that he would show through 1965. White versions of these flat, calf-high 1963-65 boots would be the first boots to be referred to as go-go boots.

Casual style in 1965.

=== Mid-1960s (1964–1966) ===
==== Bikini ====
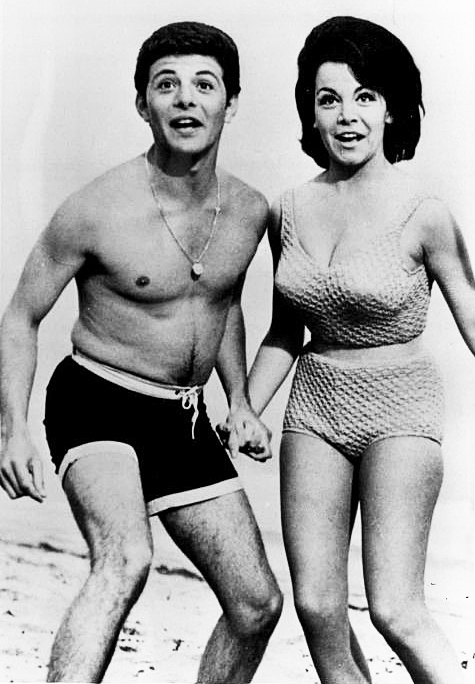
Publicity photo of Frankie Avalon and Annette Funicello for Beach Party films (c. 1960s). Funicello was not permitted to expose her navel.

The modern bikini, named after the nuclear test site on Bikini Atoll, was invented in France by Louis Réard in 1946 but struggled to gain acceptance in the mass-market during the 1950s, especially in America. In 1963, rather large versions of bikinis were featured in the surprise hit teen film Beach Party, which led to a wave of films that made the bikini a pop-culture symbol.

The first Sports Illustrated Swimsuit Issue (1964) featured Babette March in a white bikini on the cover. This has been credited with making the bikini a legitimate piece of clothing.

The monokini, also known as a "topless bikini" or "unikini", was designed by Rudi Gernreich in 1964, consisting of only a brief, close-fitting bottom and two thin straps; it was the first women's topless swimsuit. Gernreich's revolutionary and controversial design included a bottom that "extended from the midriff to the upper thigh" and was "held up by shoestring laces that make a halter around the neck." Some credit Gernreich's design with initiating, or describe it as a symbol of the sexual revolution.

==== Space-age fashions ====
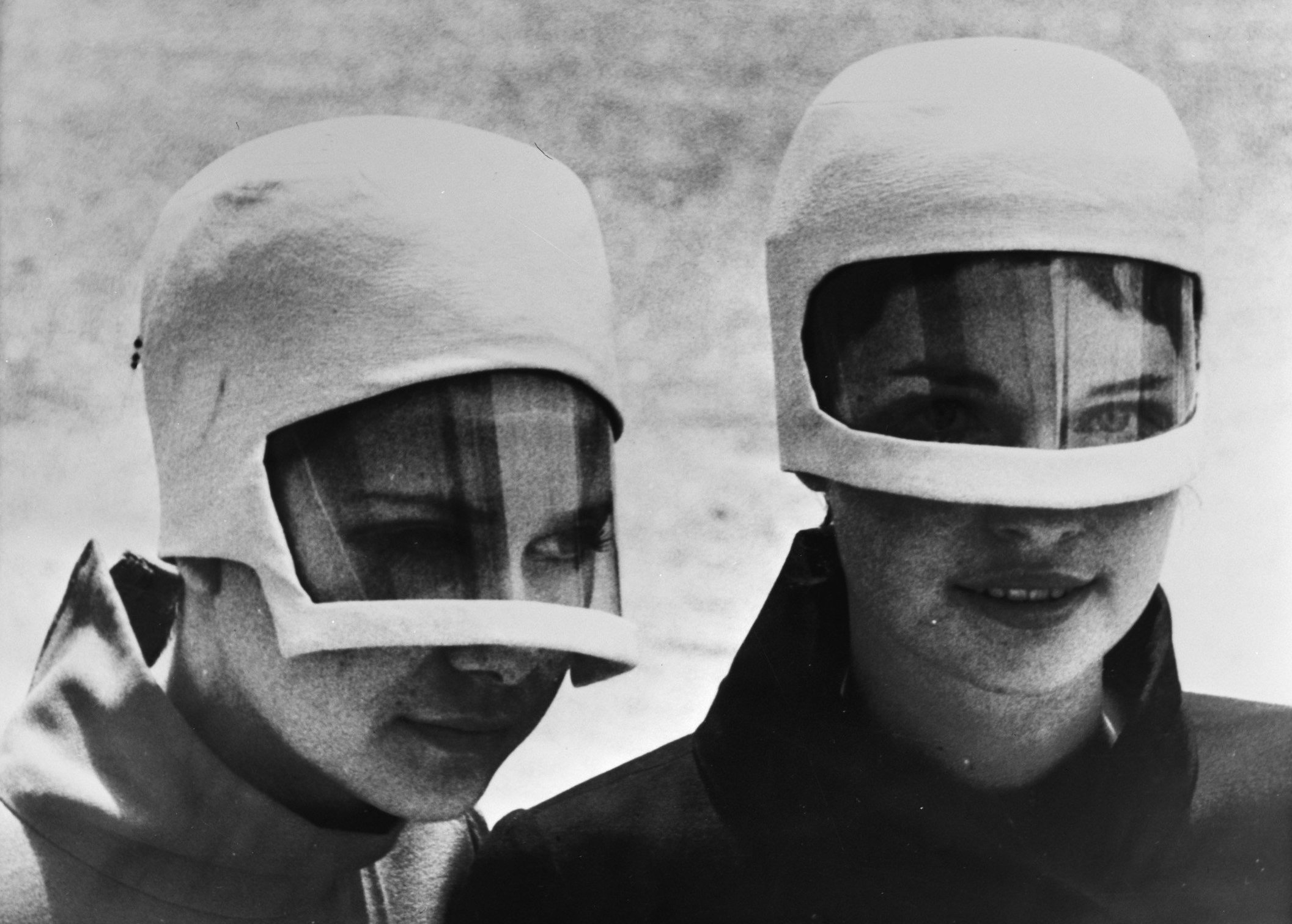
Astronaut look (Vienna)

The space age is commonly dated from 1957 to 1972, corresponding to the Space Race during the Cold War. Throughout this period, elements of mass culture—including science fiction literature, films, and television series such as Star Trek: The Original Series, Dan Dare, or Lost In Space was heavily influenced by space exploration themes. Fashion also reflected this influence by emphasizing energy and technological advancements of the period in its material, silhouettes, and styles. Pierre Cardin and André Courrèges are credited as major figures in the development of space-age fashion. Cardin had been inspired to move in a futuristic direction after seeing cosmonauts during his first visit to the Soviet Union in 1963, subsequently referring to his most avant-garde styles as Cosmonaut or Cosmocorps looks.

Synthetic material was popular among space-age fashion designers. After World War II, fabrics like nylon, corfam, orlon, terylene, lurex and spandex were promoted as cheap, easy to dry, and wrinkle-free. The synthetic fabrics of the 1960s allowed space-age fashion designers such as Pierre Cardin to design garments with bold shapes and a plastic texture. Paco Rabanne was known for his 1966 "12 Unwearable Dresses in Contemporary Materials" collection, made of chain mail, aluminum, and plastic. Rabanne would design costumes, such as the one Jane Fonda wore in the 1968 science fiction film Barbarella. People Magazine journalist Hedy Philips described Rabanne's Space Age fashion as "turning the fashion world upside down." Non-cloth material, such as polyester, lucite, and PVC, became popular in clothing and accessories as well.

The space age look featured boxy shapes, thigh-length hemlines and bold accessories. For daytime outerwear, vinyl raincoats, colorful swing coats, bubble dresses, helmet-like hats, and dyed fake furs were popular for young women. In 1966, the Nehru jacket arrived on the fashion scene and was worn by both sexes. Waistlines for women were left unmarked, and hemlines were getting shorter and shorter.

Metallic silver was a prominent color in space-age fashions, especially in 1965 and '66, as well as the stark white of André Courrèges. The futuristic-looking geometry of the Op Art of such artists as Bridget Riley, Victor Vasarely, and Richard Anuszkiewicz influenced prints, as did geometric art from earlier in the century like that of Piet Mondrian, inspiration for Yves Saint Laurent's popular Mondrian shift dresses of 1965. Fluorescent colors (also known as day-glo or neon), phosphorescent effects, and even light-up dresses like those shown by Diana Dew in 1966 were also seen.

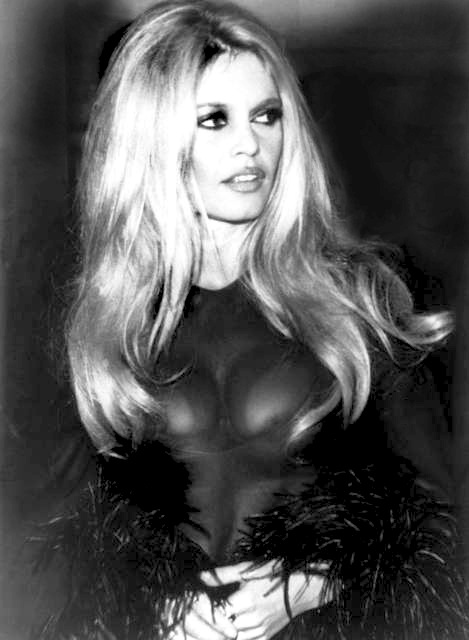
French actress Brigitte Bardot wearing a transparent top and a feather boa, 1968

Footwear for women included low-heeled sandals and kitten-heeled pumps, as well as shoes of transparent plastic and go-go boots. André Courrèges is credited as the pioneer designer of go-go boots, which were widely imitated and adapted. Courrèges' original designs featured flat heels and unconventional closures made from Velcro—a material also used by NASA within spacecrafts. Go-go boots, appearing in a variety of fluorescent colors and shiny materials like sequins, became a staple of go-go girl fashion in the 1960s. Shoes and boots were often made of patent leather or vinyl.

Other influential space-age designers included Rudi Gernreich, Emanuel Ungaro, Jean-Marie Armand, Michèle Rosier, and Diana Dew, though even designers like Yves Saint Laurent showed the look during its peak of influence from 1963 to 1967. Italian-born Pierre Cardin was best known for his helmets, short tunics, and goggles.

==== The miniskirt ====
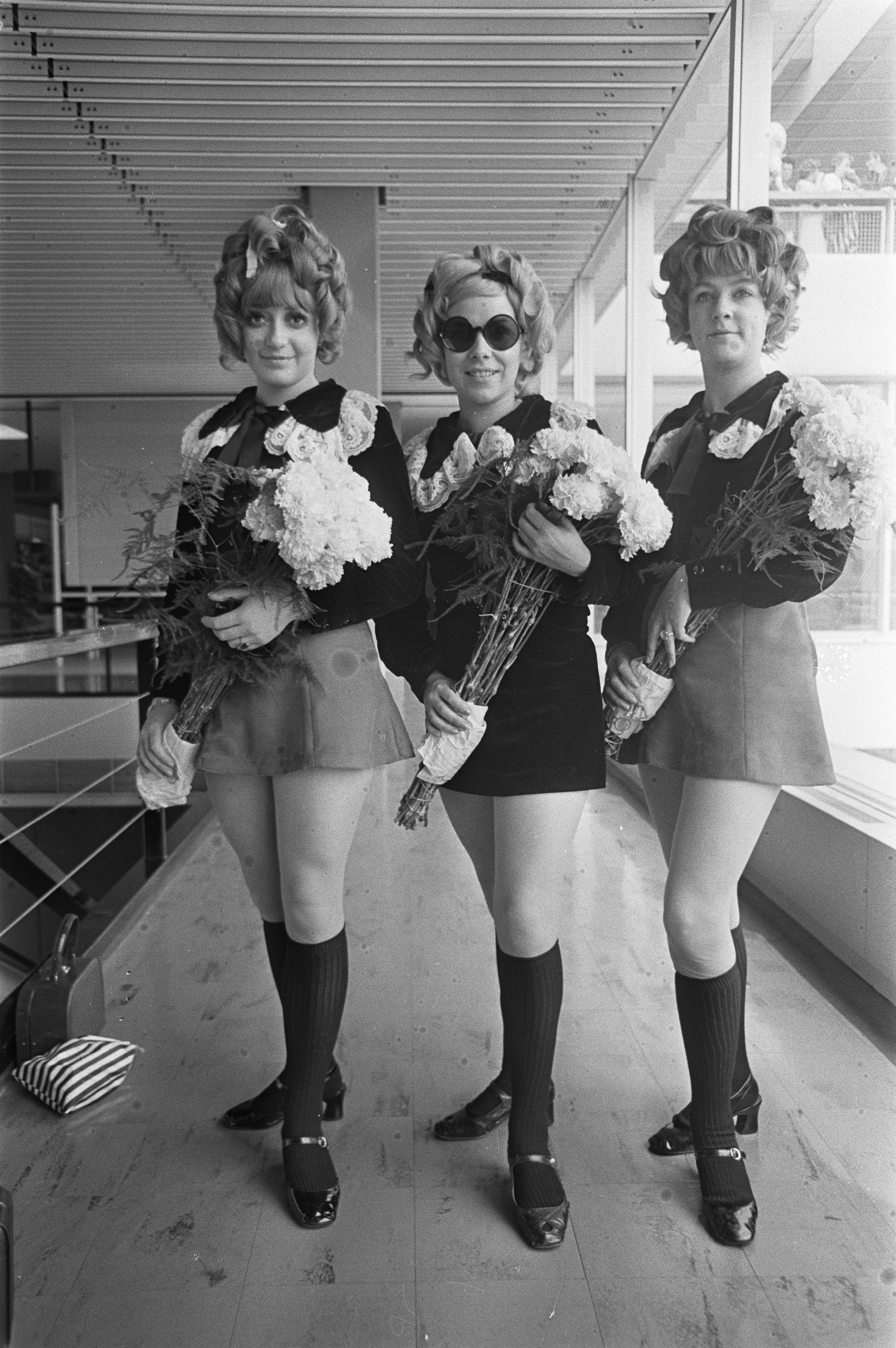
The English girl band the Paper Dolls at Schiphol Airport in 1968

The definition of a miniskirt is a skirt with a hemline around 6-7 inches above the knees. During the 1950s, the miniskirt began appearing in science fiction films like Flight to Mars and Forbidden Planet.

The miniskirt has not been unanimously attributed to a single designer. Rather, it is commonly acknowledged among historians that fashion designers like Mary Quant, André Courrèges, and John Bates all contributed to the popularity of the miniskirt in the 1960s.

Quant, a London-born British designer, is frequently cited as one of the earliest proponents of the abbreviated silhouette. In 1955, Quant opened her boutique Bazaar on the fashionable King's Road in Chelsea district of London. By 1961, Bazaar had transitioned from selling imported Italian and Austrian designs to offering Quant's very own label, which featured unconventional ready-to-wear styles like the miniskirt. The so-called "Chelsea Look"—or "Chelsea Girl"—aesthetic became closely associated with Quant's miniskirts and her other bold, youthful silhouettes displayed and sold at Bazaar. The term miniskirt likely derives from a reference to the Morris Mini-Minor automobile, or Mini Cooper, introduced in 1959. The prefix mini began appearing in print in reference to skirts and dresses by 1965. However, as late as 1966, Quant herself continued to describe her designs simply as "short, short skirts," rather than using the term miniskirt.

Courrèges was a French fashion designer who also began experimenting with hemlines in the early 1960s. He started to show space-age dresses that hit above the knee in late 1964. His clothes represented a couture version of the "Youthquake" street style and heralded the arrival of the "moon girl" look.

As teen culture became stronger, the term "Youthquake" came to mean the power of young people. This was unprecedented before the 1960s. Before World War II, teenagers dressed and acted like their parents. Many settled down and began raising families when they were young, normally right after high school. They were often expected to work and assist their families financially. Therefore, youth culture began to develop only after World War II, when the advancement of many technologies and stricter child labor laws became mainstream. Teenagers during this period had more time to enjoy their youth, and the freedom to create their own culture separate from their parents. Teens soon began establishing their own identities and communities, with their own views and ideas, breaking away from the traditions of their parents. The fabulous "little girl" look was introduced to USA—styling with Bobbie Brooks, bows, patterned knee socks and mini skirts. The miniskirt and the "little girl" look that accompanied it reflect a revolutionary shift in the way people dress. Instead of younger generations dressing like adults, they became inspired by childlike dress.

Second-wave feminism made the miniskirt popular. Women had entered the professional workforce in larger numbers during World War II, and many women soon found they craved a career and life outside the home. They wanted the same choices, freedoms, and opportunities that were offered to men.

During the mid-1960s, mod girls wore very short miniskirts, tall, brightly colored go-go boots, monochromatic geometric print patterns such as houndstooth, and tight fitted, sleeveless tunics. Flared trousers and bell bottoms appeared in 1964 as an alternative to capri pants, and led the way to the hippie period introduced in the 1960s. Bell bottoms were usually worn with chiffon blouses, polo-necked ribbed sweaters or tops that bared the midriff. These were made in a variety of materials including heavy denims, silks, and even elasticated fabrics. Variations of polyester were worn along with acrylics. A popular look for women was the suede mini-skirt worn with a French polo-neck top, square-toed boots, and Newsboy cap or beret. This style was also popular in the early 2000s.

Women were inspired by the top models of those days, such as Twiggy, Jean Shrimpton, Colleen Corby, Penelope Tree, Edie Sedgwick and Veruschka. Velvet mini dresses with lace-collars and matching cuffs, wide tent dresses and culottes pushed aside the geometric shift. False eyelashes were in vogue, as was pale lipstick. Hemlines kept rising, and by 1968 they had reached well above mid-thigh. These were known as "micro-minis". This was when the "angel dress" first made its appearance on the fashion scene. A micro-mini dress with a flared skirt and long, wide trumpet sleeves, it was usually worn with patterned tights, and was often made of crocheted lace, velvet, chiffon or sometimes cotton with a psychedelic print. The cowled-neck "monk dress" was another religion-inspired alternative; the cowl could be pulled up to be worn over the head. For evening wear, skimpy chiffon baby-doll dresses with spaghetti-straps were popular, as well as the "cocktail dress", which was a close-fitting sheath, usually covered in lace with matching long sleeves. Feather boas were occasionally worn. Famous celebrities associated with marketing the miniskirt included: Twiggy; model Jean Shrimpton, who attended an event in the Melbourne Cup Carnival in Australia wearing a miniskirt in 1965; Goldie Hawn, who appeared on Rowan and Martin's Laugh-In with her mini skirt in 1967; and Jackie Kennedy, who wore a short white pleated Valentino dress when she married Aristotle Onassis in 1968.

==== "No-bra" bras, bodystockings, and low heels ====
- Designers André Courrèges and Rudi Gernreich began discouraging bras in the first half of the 1960s, part of a move toward more comfort and a natural look after the heavily constructed, boned, wired, armor-like underwear of the 1950s like bullet bras, corsets, girdles, and garters. In 1964, Gernreich introduced the "no-bra" bra, the first bra to dispense with stiff fabrics, boning, and wiring and to be largely sheer. It immediately became a best seller and would influence other manufacturers to move in a similar direction, establishing the bra form that would dominate the late sixties and seventies.
- As knee-baring skirts reached the mainstream in the mid-sixties, stockings and garters became awkward, so women switched to tights and pantyhose. Also in 1964, Warner's introduced the first bodystocking, further aiding women in dispensing with heavy, constricting undergear. Bodystockings and similar full-body leotards or catsuits would become a base garment for a number of styles of the mid- to late sixties.
- The same move toward comfort and practicality was seen in footwear. With his groundbreaking 1964 and '65 collections, André Courrèges discarded high heels, denouncing them as unhealthy, aging, and out of step with modernity. Leading shoe designer Roger Vivier had been making his heels lower since 1956, also feeling that low heels were more suited to modern life, and would contribute to the mid-sixties vogue for flat shoes with round or square toes, a reaction against the foot-distorting pointed toes of the 1950s. Women in the sixties would find this emphasis on comfort and practicality very appealing, so that by the end of the sixties there were far fewer high heels seen on the streets.

==== The Single Girl ====
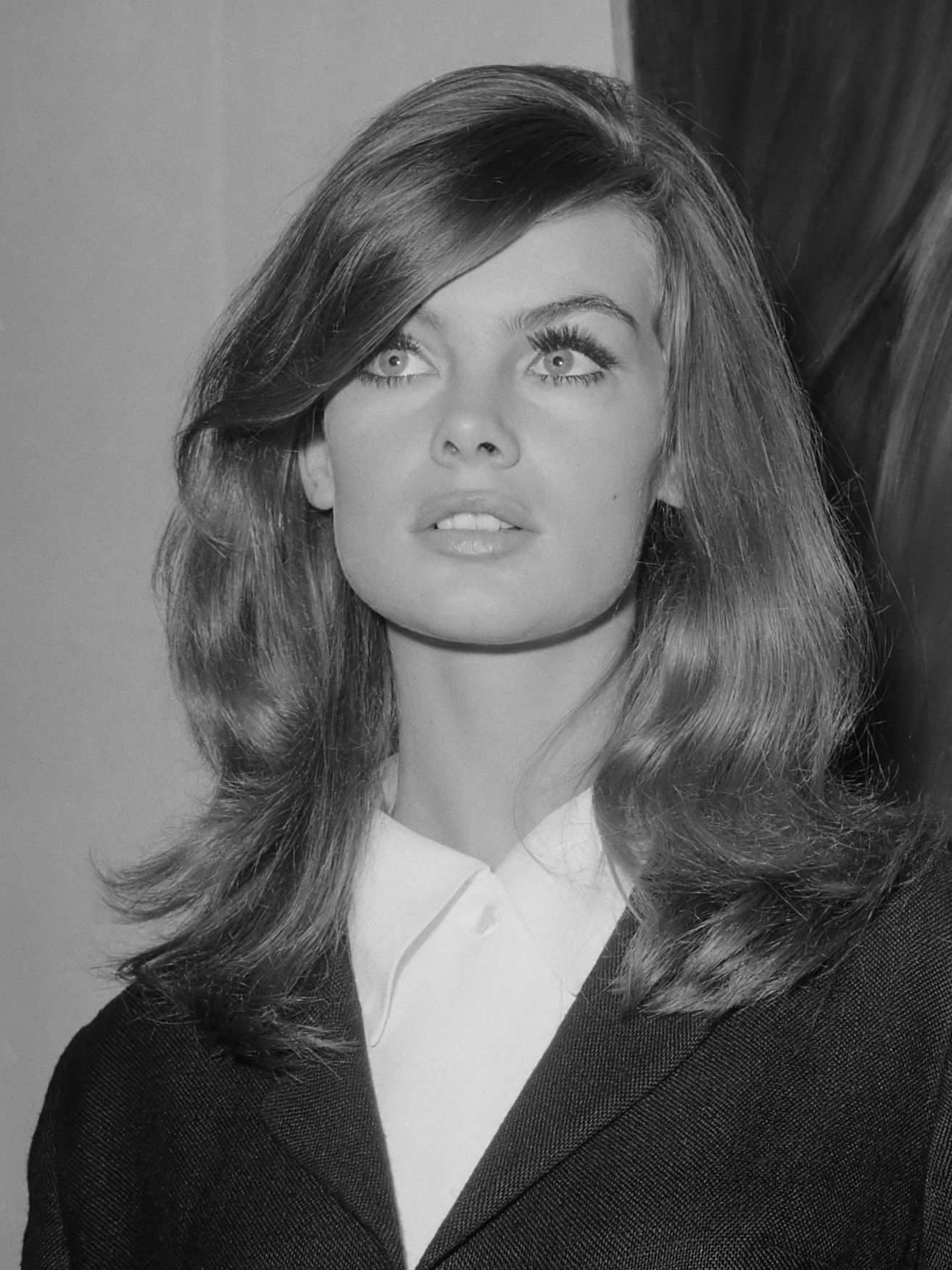
Jean Shrimpton is a model who reflected the ideal of the Single Girl.

Writer Helen Gurley Brown wrote Sex and the Single Girl in 1962. This book acted as a guide for women of any marital status to take control of their own lives financially as well as emotionally. This book was revolutionary since it encouraged sex before marriage; something that was historically looked down upon. With the high success of this book, a pathway was set for media to also encourage this behavior. Betty Friedan also wrote The Feminine Mystique the following year, giving insight into the suburban female experience, further igniting women's push for a more independent lifestyle. The second-wave of feminism was getting its start during this period: pushing for a new feminine ideal to be capitalized on.

Fashion photography in the 1960s represented a new feminine ideal for women and young girls: the Single Girl. 1960s photography was in sharp contrast to the models of the 1920s, who were carefully posed for the camera and portrayed as immobile. The Single Girl represented 'movement'. She was young, single, active, and economically self-sufficient. To represent this new Single Girl feminine ideal, many 1960s photographers photographed models outside—often having them walk or run in fashion shoots. Models in the 1960s also promoted sports wear, which reflected the modern fascination with speed and the quickening pace of the 1960s urban life. Although the Single Girl was economically, socially and emotionally self-sufficient, the ideal body form was difficult for many to achieve. Therefore, women were constrained by diet restrictions that seemed to contradict the image of the empowered 1960s Single Girl.

Fashion photographers also photographed the Single Girl wearing business wear, calling her the Working Girl. The Working Girl motif represented another shift for the modern, fashionable woman. Unlike earlier periods, characterized by formal evening gowns and the European look, the 1960s Working Girl popularized day wear and "working clothing". New ready-to-wear lines replaced individualized formal couture fashion. The Working Girl created an image of a new, independent woman who has control over her body.

There was a new emphasis on ready-to-wear and personal style. As the 1960s was an era of exponential innovation, there was appreciation for something new rather than that of quality. Spending a lot of money on an expensive, designer wardrobe was no longer the ideal and women from various statuses would be found shopping in the same stores.

The Single Girl was the true depiction of the societal and commercial obsession with the adolescent look. Particular to the mid-sixties, icons such as Twiggy popularized the shapeless shift dresses emphasizing an image of innocence as they did not fit to any contours of the human body. The female body has forever been a sign of culturally constructed ideals. The long-limbed and pre-pubescent style of the time depicts how women were able to be more independent, yet paradoxically, also were put into a box of conceived ideals.

==== Dolly Girl ====
The "Dolly Girl" was another archetype for young females in the 1960s. She emerged in the mid-1960s, and her defining characteristic is the iconic miniskirt. "Dolly Girls" also sported long hair, slightly teased, and childish-looking clothing. Clothes were worn tight fitting, sometimes even purchased from a children's section. Dresses were often embellished with lace, ribbons, and other frills; the look was topped off with light colored tights. Crocheted clothing also took off within this specific style.

Corsets, seamed tights, and skirts covering the knees were no longer fashionable. The idea of buying urbanized clothing that could be worn with separate pieces was intriguing to women of this era. In the past, one would only buy specific outfits for certain occasions.

=== Late 1960s (1967–1969) ===
==== The hippie subculture ====
Starting in 1967, youth culture began to change musically and mod culture shifted to a more laid back hippie or Bohemian style. Hosiery manufacturers of the time like Mary Quant (who founded Pamela Mann Legwear) combined the "Flower Power" style of dress and the Pop Art school of design to create fashion tights that would appeal to a female audience that enjoyed psychedelia. Ponchos, moccasins, love beads, peace signs, medallion necklaces, chain belts, polka dot-printed fabrics, and long, puffed "bubble" sleeves were popular fashions in the late 1960s. Both men and women wore frayed bell-bottomed jeans, tie-dyed shirts, work shirts, Jesus sandals, and headbands. Women would often go barefoot and some went braless. The idea of multiculturalism also became very popular; a lot of style inspiration was drawn from traditional clothing in Nepal, India, Bali, Morocco, and African countries. Because inspiration was being drawn from all over the world, there was increasing separation of style; clothing pieces often had similar elements and created similar silhouettes, but there was no real "uniform".

Fringed buck-skin vests, flowing caftans, the "lounging" or "hostess" pajamas were also popular. "Hostess" pajamas consisted of a tunic top over floor-length culottes, usually made of polyester or chiffon. Long maxi coats, often belted and lined in sheepskin, appeared at the close of the decade. Animal prints were popular for women in the autumn and winter of 1969.

==== Indian fashion ====
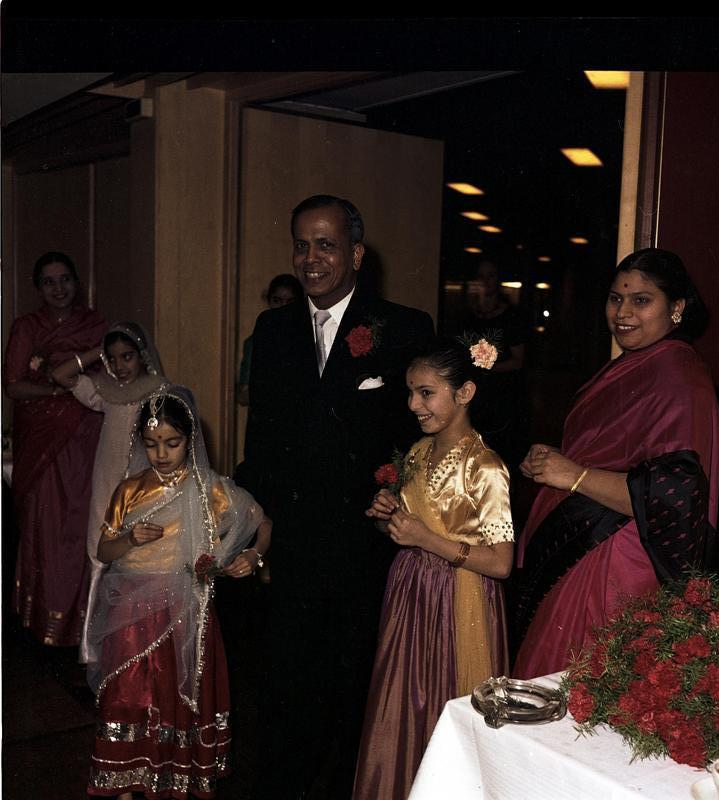
Middle class Indian menswear followed postwar European trends, but most women continued to wear traditional dress such as the sari.

In general, urban Indian men imitated Western fashions such as the business suit. This was adapted to India's hot tropical climate as the Nehru suit, a garment often made from khadi that typically had a mandarin collar and patch pockets. From the early 1950s until the mid-1960s, most Indian women maintained traditional dress such as the gagra choli, sari, and churidar. At the same time as the hippies of the late 1960s were imitating Indian fashions, however, some fashion conscious Indian and Ceylonese women began to incorporate modernist Western trends. One particularly infamous fad combined the miniskirt with the traditional sari, prompting a moral panic where conservatives denounced the so-called "hipster sari" as indecent.

==== Feminist influences ====
During the late 1960s, there was a backlash by radical feminists in America against accouterments of what they perceived to be enforced femininity within the fashion industry. Instead, these activists wore androgynous and masculine clothing such as jeans, work boots or berets. Black feminists often wore afros in reaction to the hair straighteners associated with middle class white women. At the 1968 feminist Miss America protest, protestors symbolically threw a number of feminine fashion-related products into a "Freedom Trash Can," including false eyelashes, high-heeled shoes, curlers, hairspray, makeup, girdles, corsets, and bras which they termed "instruments of female torture".

== Men's fashion ==
=== Early 1960s (1960–1963) ===
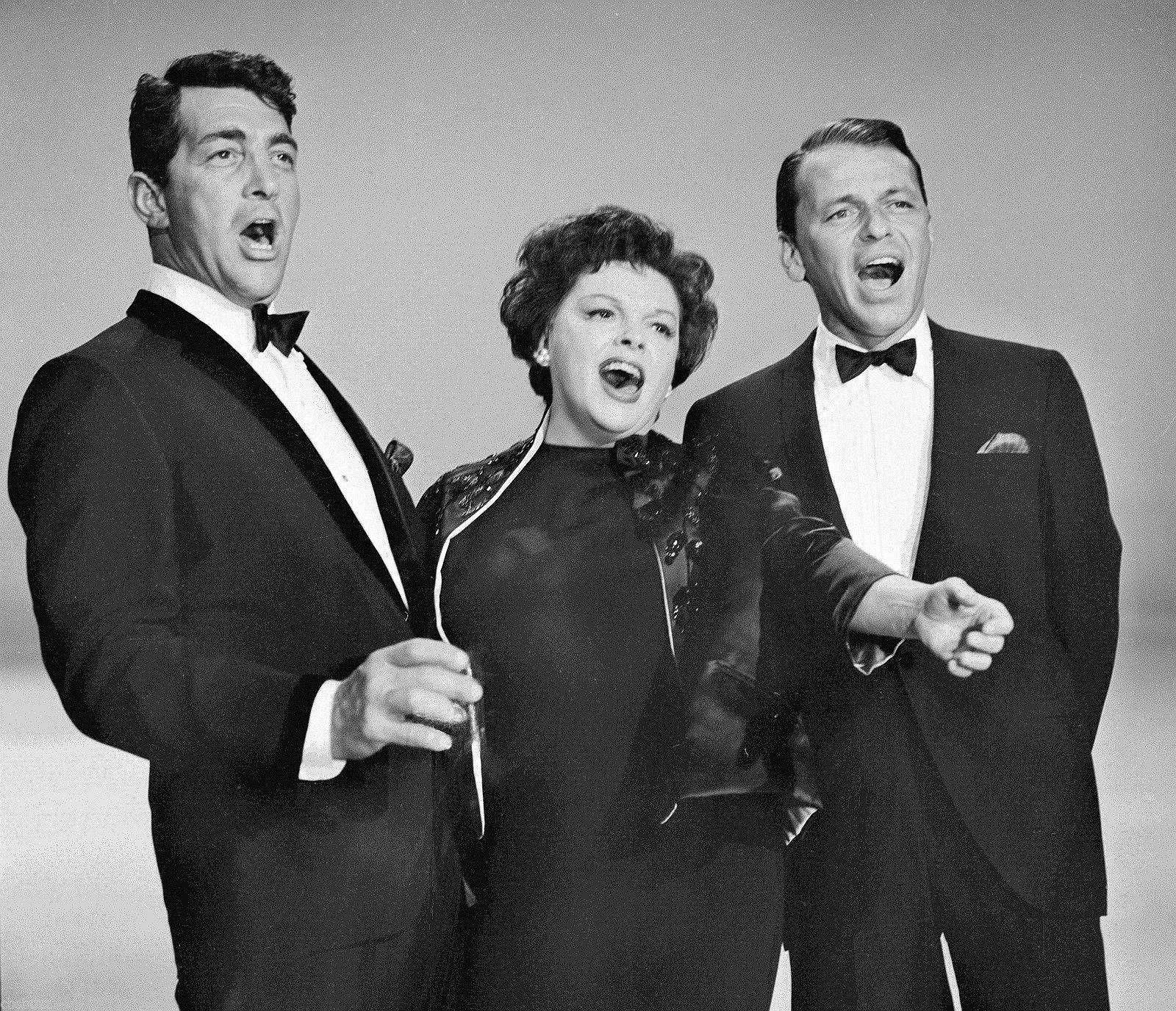
Slim fitting tuxedos worn by Frank Sinatra and Dean Martin, 1962

==== Business wear ====
During the early 1960s, slim fitting single breasted continental style suits and skinny ties were fashionable in the UK and America. These suits, as worn by Sean Connery as James Bond, the Rat Pack's Frank Sinatra, and the cast of Mad Men, were often made from grey flannel, mohair or sharkskin. Tuxedos were cut in a similar form fitting style, with shawl collars and a single button, and were available either in the traditional black, or in bright colors such as red or sky blue popularized by Frankie Valli of The Four Seasons. Men's hats, including the pork pie hat and Irish hat, had narrower brims than the homburgs and fedoras worn in the 1950s and earlier. During the mid-1960s, hats began to decline after presidents John F. Kennedy and Lyndon B. Johnson appeared in public without one.

==== Ivy League ====
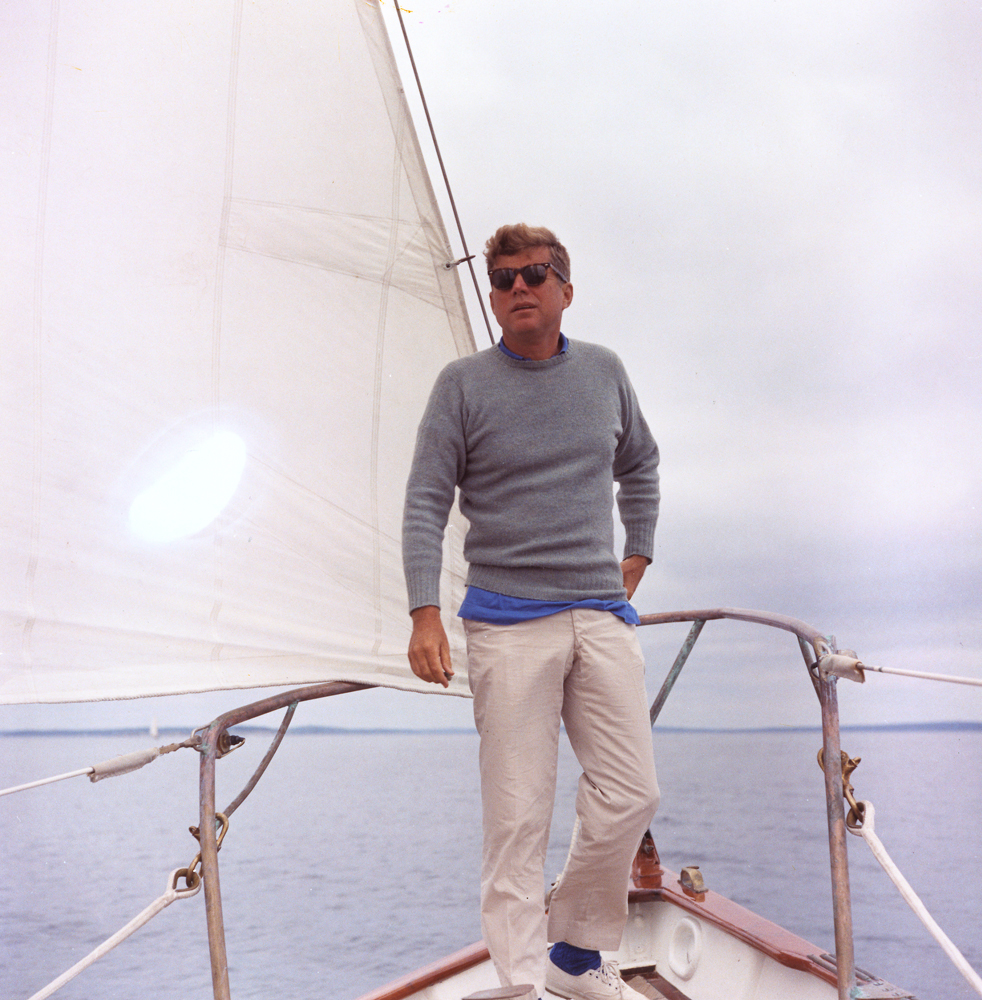
Casual Ivy League outfit worn by President John F Kennedy in 1962

Ivy League fashion, the precursor to the modern preppy look, was desirable casual wear for middle class adults in America during the early to mid-1960s. Typical outfits included polo shirts, harrington jackets, khaki chino pants, striped T-shirts, Argyle socks, seersucker or houndstooth sportcoats, sweater vests, cardigan sweaters, Nantucket Reds, basketweave loafers, Madras plaid shirts, and narrow brimmed Trilbys sometimes made from straw. The style remained fashionable for men until it was supplanted by more casual everyday clothing influenced by the hippie counterculture during the late 1960s and early 1970s.

==== Pierre Cardin ====
The most influential menswear designer in the 1960s was Pierre Cardin. His menswear collection from the year 1960 emphasized a slim, youthful, natural-shouldered silhouette that he referred to as a cylinder. It included foulard shirts, prominent belts, center-vented jackets, and collarless suits that were widely copied, including by the Beatles in 1963. Cardin's influence on menswear would grow throughout the decade.

=== Mid-1960s (1964–1966) ===
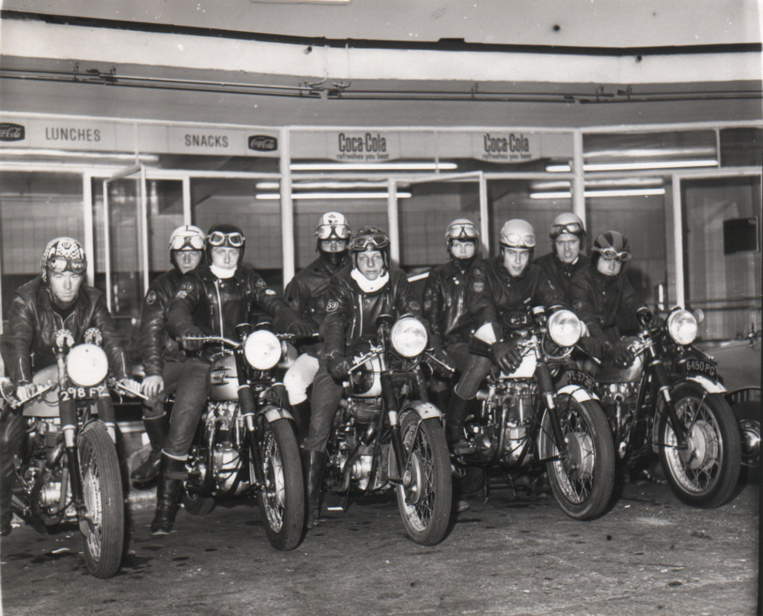
During the early and mid-1960s, greasers, also known as ton-up boys, were identifiable by their blue jeans and black Schott Perfecto leather jackets.

==== Surf fashion ====
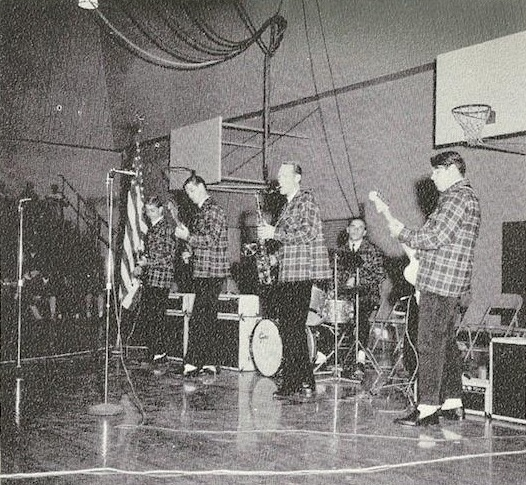
The Beach Boys in 1963

In America and Australia, surf rock went mainstream from 1962 to 1966, resulting in many teenage baby boomers imitating the outfits of groups like The Beach Boys. Pendleton jackets were common due to their cheapness, warmth and durability. Design wise, the surf jacket suited popularly with nonchalance, warmth for coastal Californian climate, and utility pockets for surf wax and VW car keys, two surf essentials (Pendleton Woolen Mills).

The Pendleton Surf Jacket expanded upon fifties pop-cultural fashions, however new in its relaxed, intangibly cool vibe. The surf jacket split itself from the tough guy rock 'n' roll teen, and mellowing leather's rock attitudes to woolen plaids. Following Rock n Roll's decline were rebels without causes, "Greasers" and "Beats"; dressed down in inappropriate daywear to denounce conformity, Sixties youth, inventors of Surf Fashion, expressed more nomadic and hedonically in this "dress down" style. Surf styles mainstreamed into fashion when Soul Surfers wanted to make livings in surfing-associated careers. They opened businesses that expanded selling surf products into selling surf clothing. These surfer entrepreneurs proliferate surf fashion by mixing their lifestyles into casual wear. As Rock n Roll Beats, and Greaser car clubs used jackets to identify, and as 1950 varsity sports wore lettered cardigans, 1960s Surfies wore surf jackets to identify with surf clubs and as surfers (Retro 1960s Swimwear). Jackets worn as group status identifiers continued in the Sixties, but with focus around beach music and lifestyle. Cartoon character Johnny Bravo is based in surfers fashion of 1960s.

As surfers banded over localism, plaid and striped surf jackets gained relevancy. Teens wore them to proclaim surf clubs; what beach they were from, and where they surfed. For a surfer though, it is curious why a woolen plaid jacket paired with UGG boots, and not the board-short or aloha shirt identified the surfer. The Pendleton plaid, originally worn by loggers, hunters and fishermen, was a common item of casual wear for American men of all classes before the British invasion. For the youth of the 1960s, however, the plaid Pendleton signified counterculture, and tribal seamen style translated from Welsh folklore, rebellious Scots Highlanders, and rugged American frontiersmen (Bowe).

The Sixties invented the Californian Cool style, by relaxing style to escape Cold War meltdowns with Polynesian fascinations, bridging the macho 1950s teen towards 1960s hippie style. The Cold War's tense political context conceived Surf Fashion as a way to relax and escape established violence. California, the birthplace of American Surfing, also produced much of the technology experimentations used in the nuclear space race. Caltech designers in Pasadena were designing nuclear arms for day jobs and were surfing at night. The modern surfboard design itself originates from the military-industrial complex's product development, where the Manhattan Project's Hugh Bradner also designed the modern neoprene wetsuit (Inside the Curl).

Californian engineers for the Cold War were also surfing and equally engineering that fashion. Just as the Bikini's name comes from a nuclear test site, Surf fashion in this era consistently references the Cold War context. Surfing became an attractive fashion identity in this era because it perpetuates adolescence, and the pursuit of pleasure in times of anxiety and paranoia. In a teenage-driven culture, which aimed to ignore establishment conflicts, surfers mused Hawaii and its associated tiki culture as a place of escape with tropical paradises as the antithesis to modern society. This sustained Hawaiian flora and fauna patterns' in fashion its attraction. The Sixties Surfer was not the first to escape violence or revolutionize the pursuit of happiness through Polynesian fascination. Accounts of Thomas Jefferson theorize that his exposure to the surfer image in South Pacific travel journals influenced his imagined Pursuit of Happiness (Martin D. Henry). Similarly, Hawaii's surfer image and Californian translation responds to the decade's violence and further inspired full-on nonviolent revolutionary hippie fashions.

Additionally, as Californian water inspired lifestyles influenced fashion, many guys improvised their own faded jeans using chlorine from backyard swimming pools. Sneakers such as Converse All Stars made the transition from sportswear to streetwear, and guys in California and Hawaii began to grow out their hair.

==== Mod and British Invasion influences ====
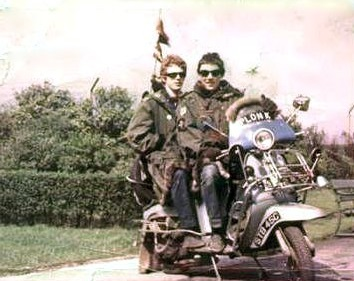
The mods were a British fashion phenomenon in the mid-1960s with their parkas, tailored Italian suits, and scooters.

The leaders of mid-1960s style were the British. The mods (short for Modernists) adopted new fads that would be imitated by many young people. Mods formed their own way of life creating television shows and magazines that focused directly on the lifestyles of mods. British rock bands such as the Who, the Small Faces, the Beatles, and the Kinks emerged from the mod subculture. It was not until 1964, when the Modernists were truly recognized by the public, that women really were accepted in the group. Women had short, clean haircuts and often dressed in similar styles to the male mods.

The mods' lifestyle and musical tastes were the exact opposite of their rival group, known as the Rockers. The rockers liked 1950s rock-and roll, wore black leather jackets, greased, pompadour hairstyles, and rode motorbikes. The look of the mods was classy. They mimicked the clothing and hairstyles of high fashion designers in France and Italy, opting for tailored suits that were topped by parkas. They rode on scooters, usually Vespas or Lambrettas. Mod fashion was often described as the City Gent look. The young men incorporated striped boating blazers and bold prints into their wardrobe. Shirts were slim, with a necessary button down collar accompanied by slim fitted trousers. Levi's were the only type of jeans worn by Modernists.

In the USSR during the mid- to late 1960s, mods and hippies were nicknamed Hairies for their mop top hair. As with the earlier Stilyagi in the 1950s, young Russian men who dressed this way were ridiculed in the media, and sometimes forced to get their hair cut in police stations.

==== Fitted suits, turtlenecks, and the Space Age ====
In the mid-sixties, Pierre Cardin would introduce fitted suits that would increase his fame and catapult his menswear to greater prominence than his womenswear, further cementing his status as the most influential menswear designer of the era. His innovations included longer suit jackets with clearly marked waists and a slight flare at the hips, knit suits, revived double-breasting, vests, wider lapels, large collars, wide ties with large knots, turtlenecks even for formal wear, open-fronted shirts for casualwear, slightly flared trousers, more color, extensive use of zippers, and sleek, modern-looking ankle boots. Such a sleek fit-and-flair cut hadn't been seen in decades and the public found it very flattering, with Americans demanding that it be brought to the US, making Cardin perhaps the first designer that men asked for by name. Many of his men's styles were clearly influenced by trends coming out of the UK and he employed only British-trained tailors at his flagship Paris men's boutique. The press proclaimed him the main non-British leader of the Peacock Revolution that was burgeoning in London. In 1966, he introduced a Space Age Cosmonaut or Cosmocorps menswear line inspired by the Soviet Union's space program that consisted of hip-belted tunics, turtlenecks, tights-like or flared trousers, and sleek, modern-looking, buckled or gusseted boots that ranged from ankle to knee in height. This complimented his geometric Space Age womenswear of the period and would grow in popularity into the late sixties.

=== Late 1960s (1967–1969) ===
==== Folk and counterculture influences ====
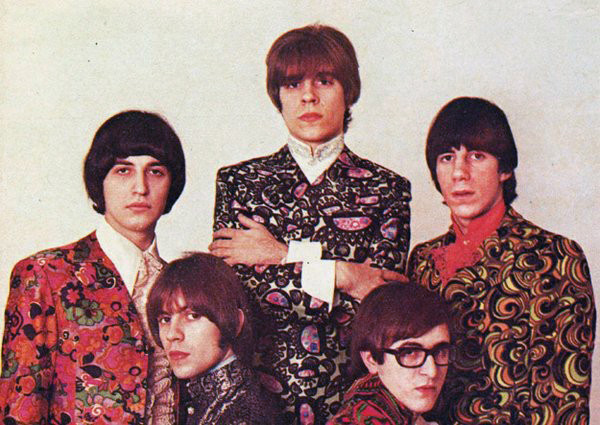
Argentine rock band Los Gatos in 1968, with psychedelic prints and British-inspired hairstyles

The late 1960s to early 1970s witnessed the emergence of the hippie counterculture and freak scene in Britain, Australia, New Zealand and the United States. Middle class youths of both sexes favored a unisex look with long hair, tie dye and flower power motifs, Bob Dylan caps, kurtas, hemp waistcoats, baja jackets, bell bottoms, sheepskin vests, western shirts and ponchos inspired by acid Westerns, sandals, digger hats, and patches featuring flowers or peace symbols. Jimi Hendrix popularized the wearing of old military dress uniforms as a statement that war was obsolete. Early hippies, derisively referred to as freaks by the older generation, also used elements of roleplay such as headbands, cloaks, frock coats, kaftans, corduroy pants, cowboy boots, and vintage clothing from charity shops, suggesting a romantic historical era, a distant region, or a gathering of characters from a fantasy or science fiction novel.

==== Western clothing ====
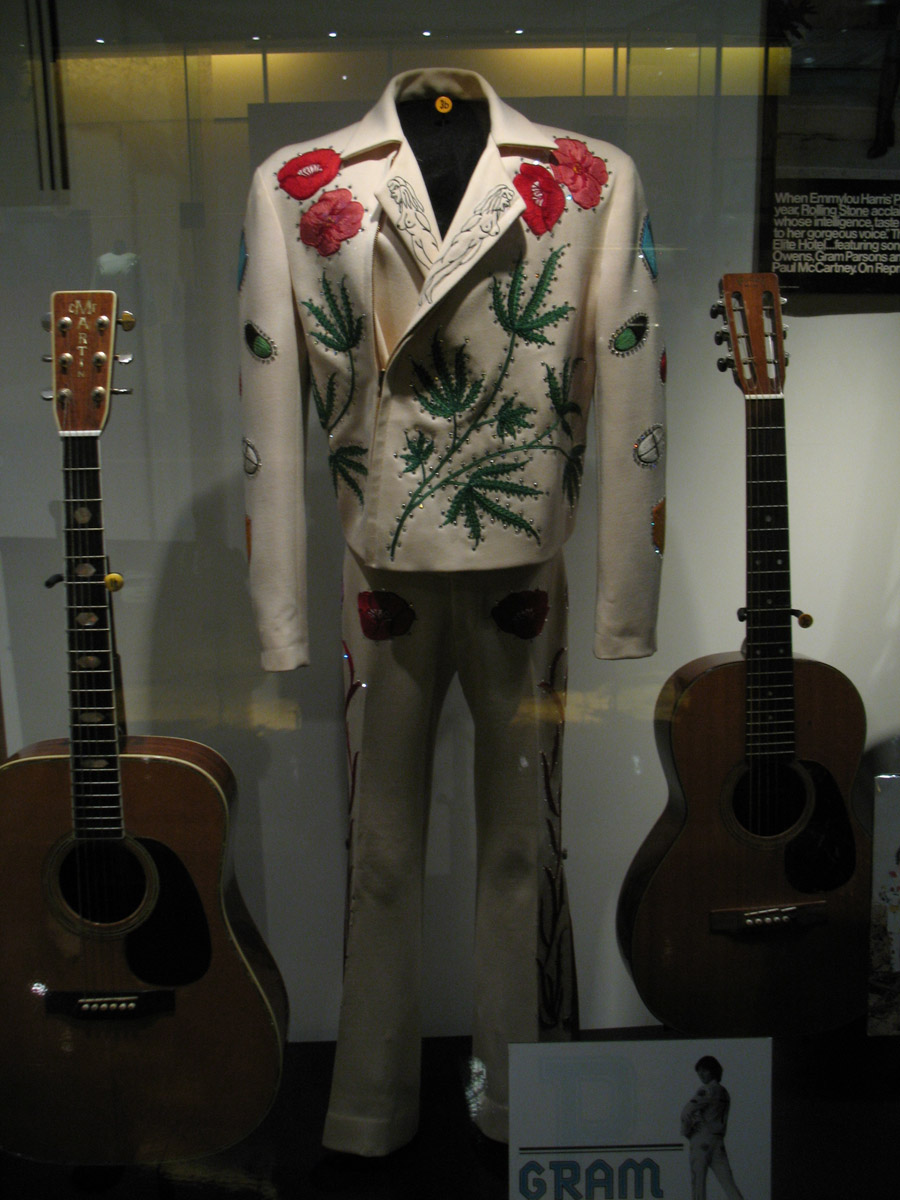
Gram Parsons' nudie suit

From the late 1960s until the early 1970s Western clothing was popular in America due to the success of the spaghetti western and the emergence of a new generation of country musicians like Gram Parsons of the Flying Burrito Brothers, Commander Cody, New Riders of the Purple Sage, and John Denver. The nudie suits and elaborately embroidered Rockmount shirts of the 1940s were updated with psychedelic hippie inspired motifs including naked women, cannabis leaves, sugar skulls, flames, Native American patterns, and brightly colored flowers like the rose or opium poppy. Typical apparel included Levi 501 or Lee jeans as worn by Charles Bronson, orange label jean jackets, duster coats, cowboy boots, all black outfits inspired by Roy Orbison and Johnny Cash, plaid shirts with pearl snaps, sheepskin vests, and ponchos inspired by Clint Eastwood.

==== Peacock Revolution ====
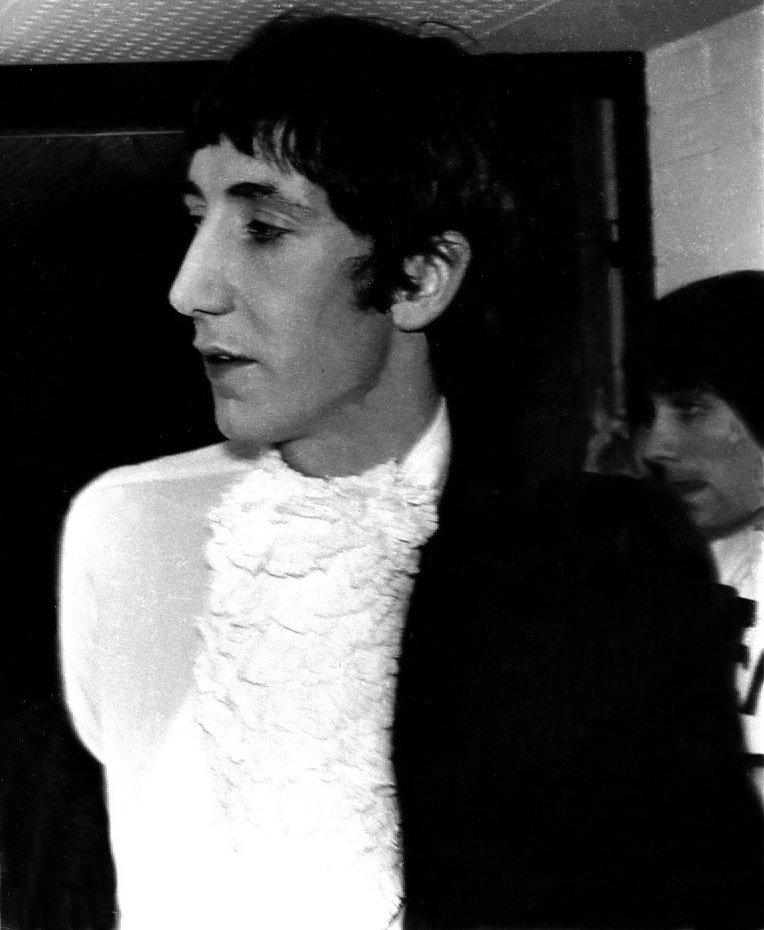
Pete Townshend of the Who with lace sewn into his clothing, 1967

By 1968, the space age mod fashions had been gradually replaced by Victorian, Edwardian and Belle Époque influenced style, with men wearing double-breasted suits of crushed velvet or striped patterns, brocade waistcoats and shirts with frilled collars. Their hair worn below the collar bone. Rolling Stones guitarist Brian Jones epitomised this "dandified" look. Due to the colorful nature of menswear, the time period was described as the Peacock Revolution, and male trendsetters in Britain and America were called "Dandies," "Dudes," or "Peacocks." From the late 1960s until the mid-1970s, Carnaby Street and Chelsea's Kings Road were virtual fashion parades, as mainstream menswear took on psychedelic influences. Business suits were replaced by Bohemian Carnaby Street creations that included corduroy, velvet or brocade double breasted suits, frilly shirts, cravats, wide ties and trouser straps, leather boots, and even Mandarin-collared Nehru jackets or Mao jackets in both plain fabrics and fancy brocades, chintzes, and vivid prints. The slim neckties of the early 1960s were replaced with Kipper ties exceeding five inches in width, and featuring crazy prints, stripes and patterns.

== Hairstyles ==
=== Women's hairstyles ===
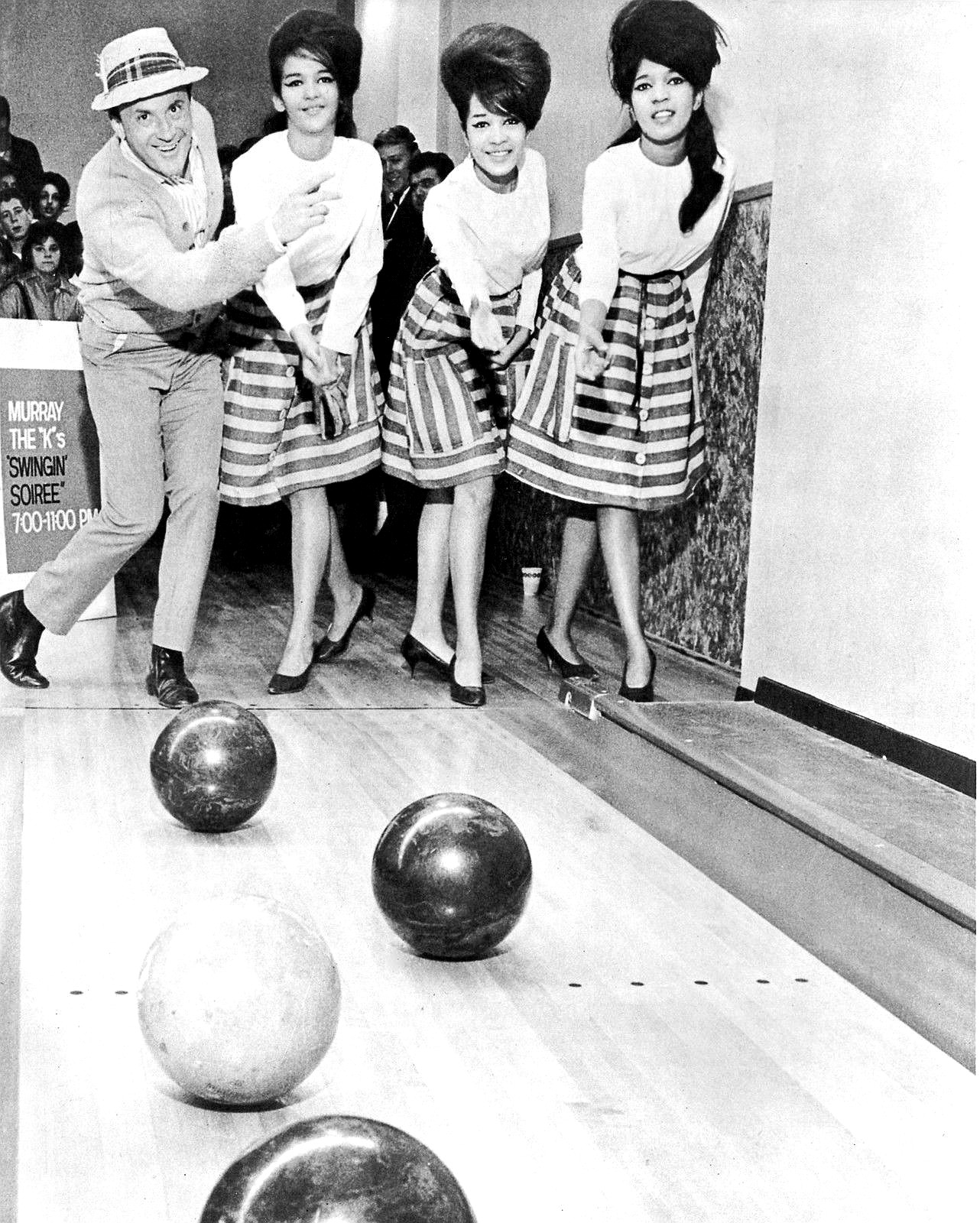
The Ronettes with their signature beehive hairstyles

Women's hair styles ranged from beehive hairdos in the early part of the decade to the very short styles popularized by Twiggy and Mia Farrow just five years later to a very long straight style as popularized by the hippies in the late 1960s. Between these extremes, the chin-length contour cut and the pageboy were also popular. The pillbox hat was fashionable, due almost entirely to the influence of Jacqueline Kennedy, who was a style-setter throughout the decade. Her bouffant hairstyle, described as a "grown-up exaggeration of little girls' hair", was created by Kenneth.

During the mid- and late 1960s, women's hair styles became very big and used a large quantity of hair spray, as worn in real life by Ronnie Spector and parodied in the musical Hairspray. Wigs became fashionable and were often worn to add style and height. The most important change in hairstyles at this time was that men and women wore androgynous styles that resembled each other. In the UK, it was the new fashion for mod women to cut their hair short and close to their heads. Meanwhile, hippie girls favored long, straight natural hair, kept in place with a bandana.

=== Men's hairstyles ===
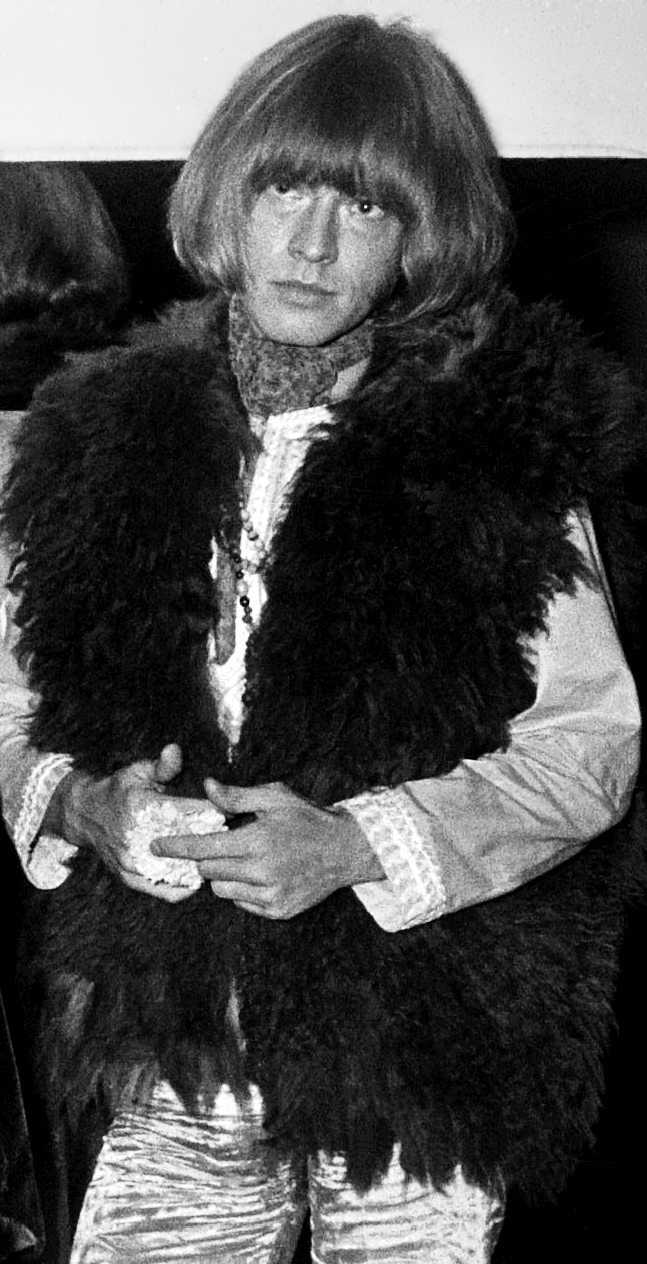
Brian Jones of the Rolling Stones with typical mod haircut, 1967

For professional men born before 1940, the side parted short back and sides was the norm in the UK, Europe and America from the early '60s until the end of the decade. Black men usually buzzed their hair short or wore styles like the conk, artificially straightened with chemicals. Blue collar white men, especially former military personnel, often wore buzzcuts and flat tops.

The mod haircut began as a short version around 1963 through 1964, developed into a longer style worn during 1965–66, and eventually evolved into an unkempt hippie version worn during the 1967–1969 period and into the early 1970s. Facial hair, evolving in its extremity from simply having longer sideburns, to mustaches and goatees, to full-grown beards became popular with young British, European and American men from 1966 onwards.

Head coverings changed dramatically towards the end of the decade as men's hats went out of style, replaced by the bandanna, digger hat, Stetson, or Bob Dylan cap if anything at all. As men let their hair grow long, the Afro became the hairstyle of choice for African Americans. This afro was not just a fashion statement but also an emblem of racial pride. They started to believe that by allowing their hair to grow in its nature state without chemical treatments, they would be accepting their racial identities.

== Image gallery ==
A selection of images representing the fashion trends of the 1960s:

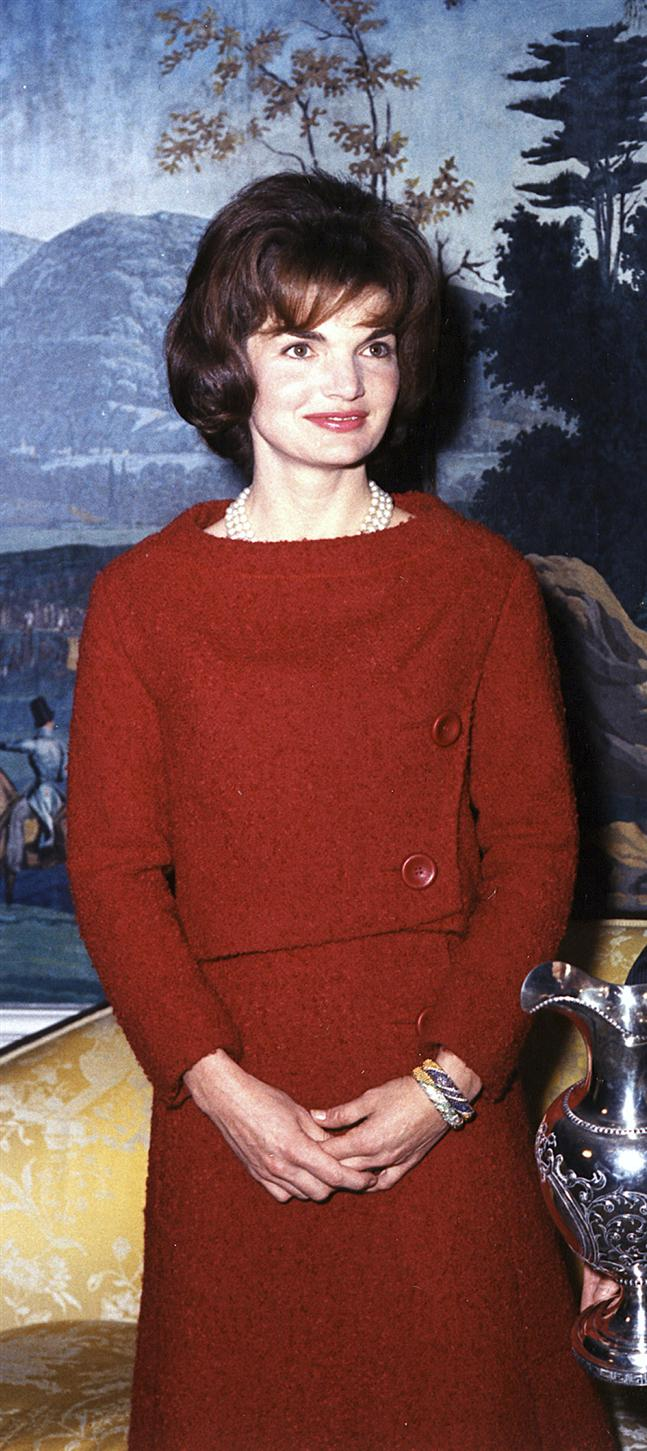
First Lady Jacqueline Kennedy wearing a red wool dress with matching jacket. She was a fashion icon in the early 1960s.

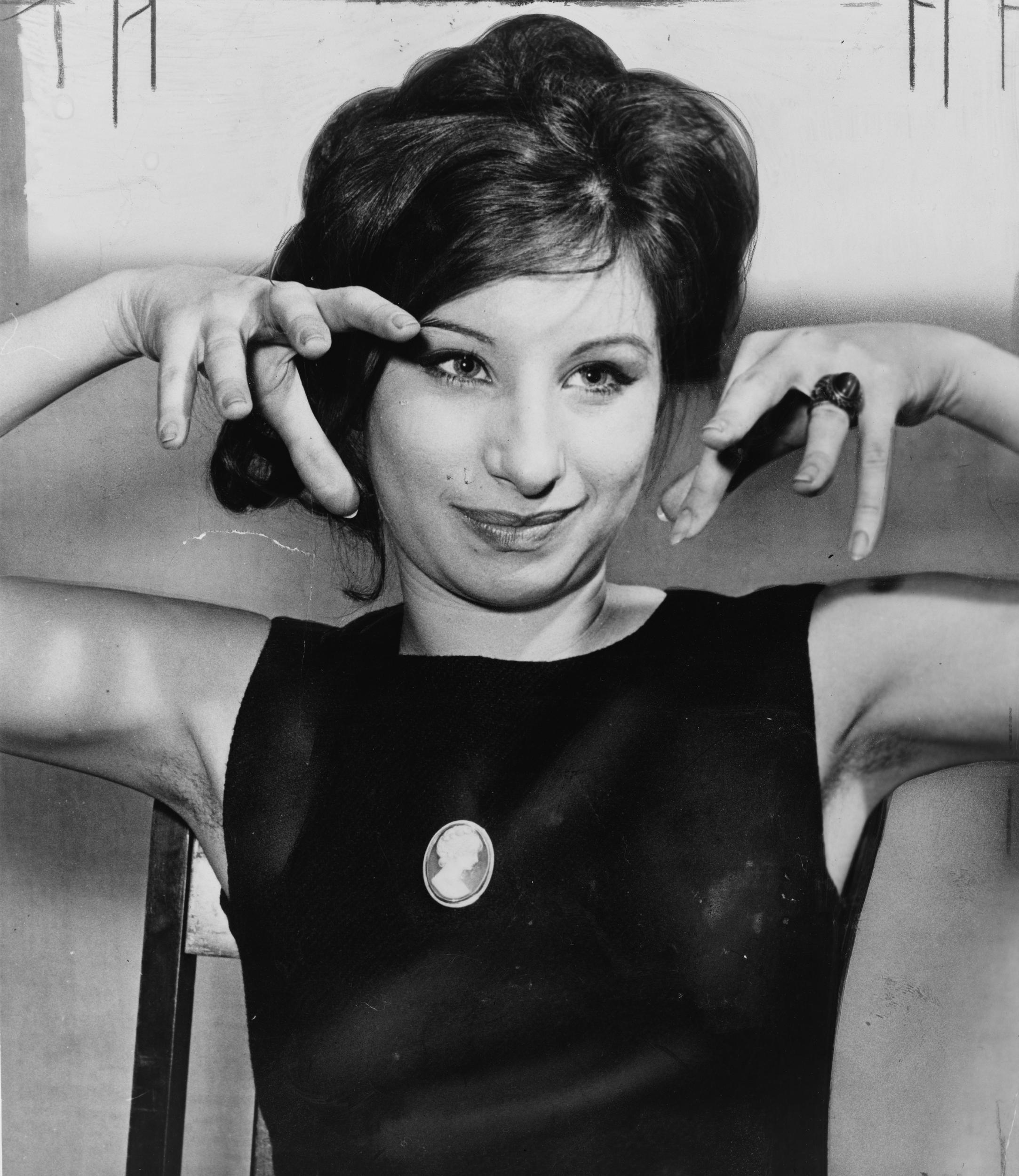
Singer and actress Barbra Streisand in 1962 wearing a top with a crew-neck. Her hair is teased at the crown.

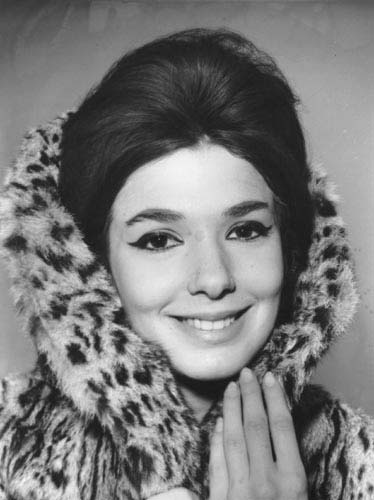
Graciela Borges, Argentine fashion icon of the 1960s, wearing a fur coat, bouffant hair and winged eye liner

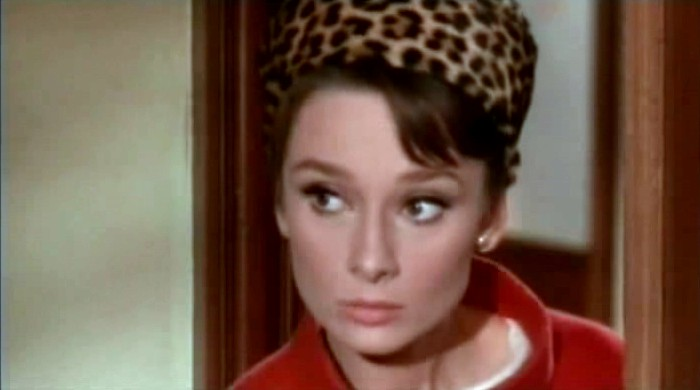
Audrey Hepburn in a scene from the comic thriller Charade dressed by Givenchy 1963

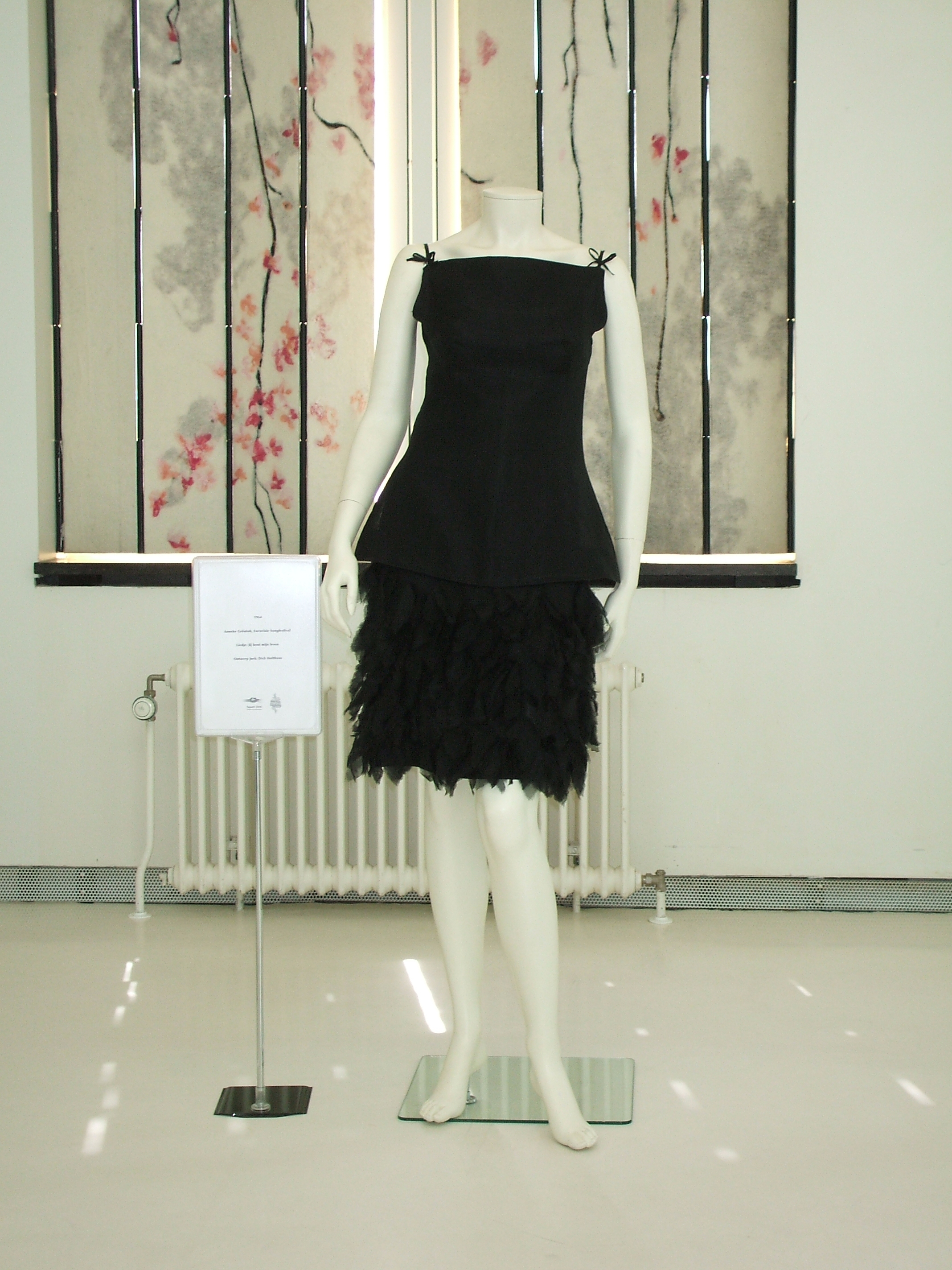
Dress worn by Anneke Grönloh for the 1964 Eurovision Song Contest

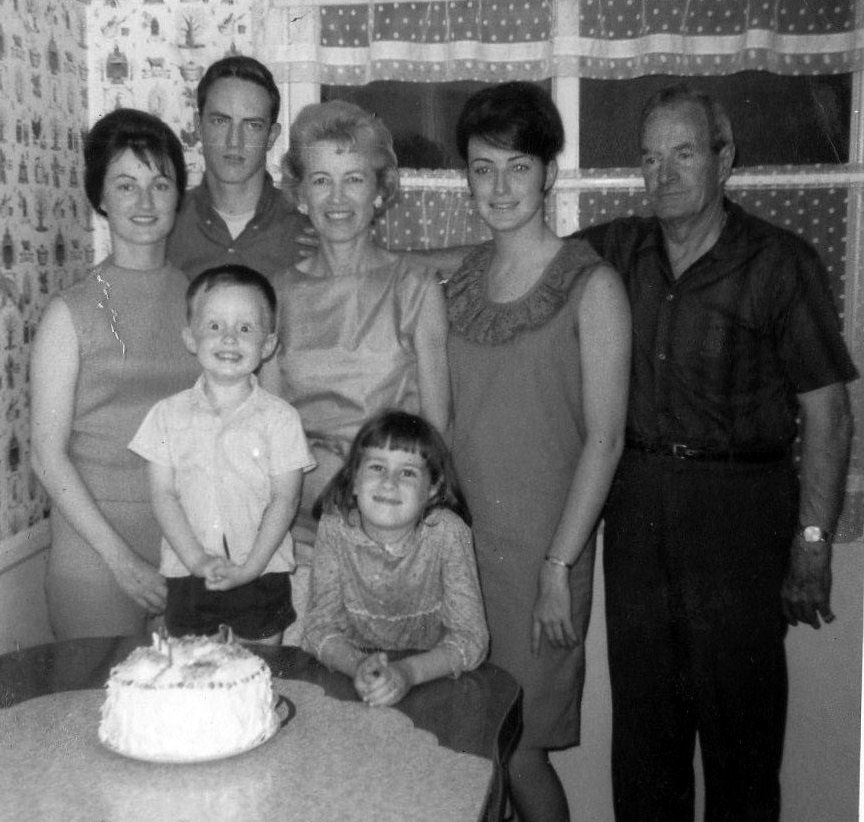
In 1965, sleeveless shift dresses were popular with women.

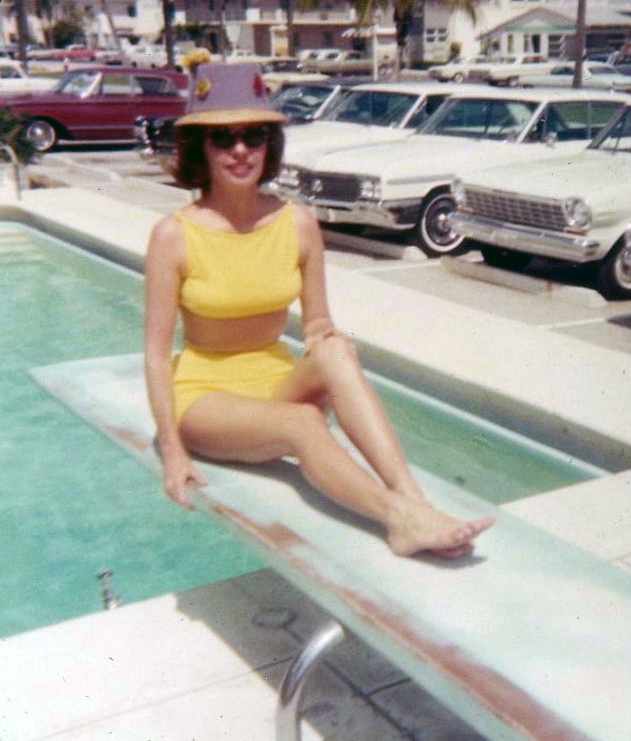
Young woman in Florida, 1965

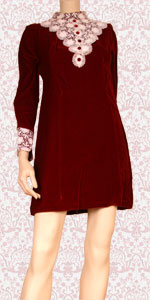
A velvet minidress from 1965

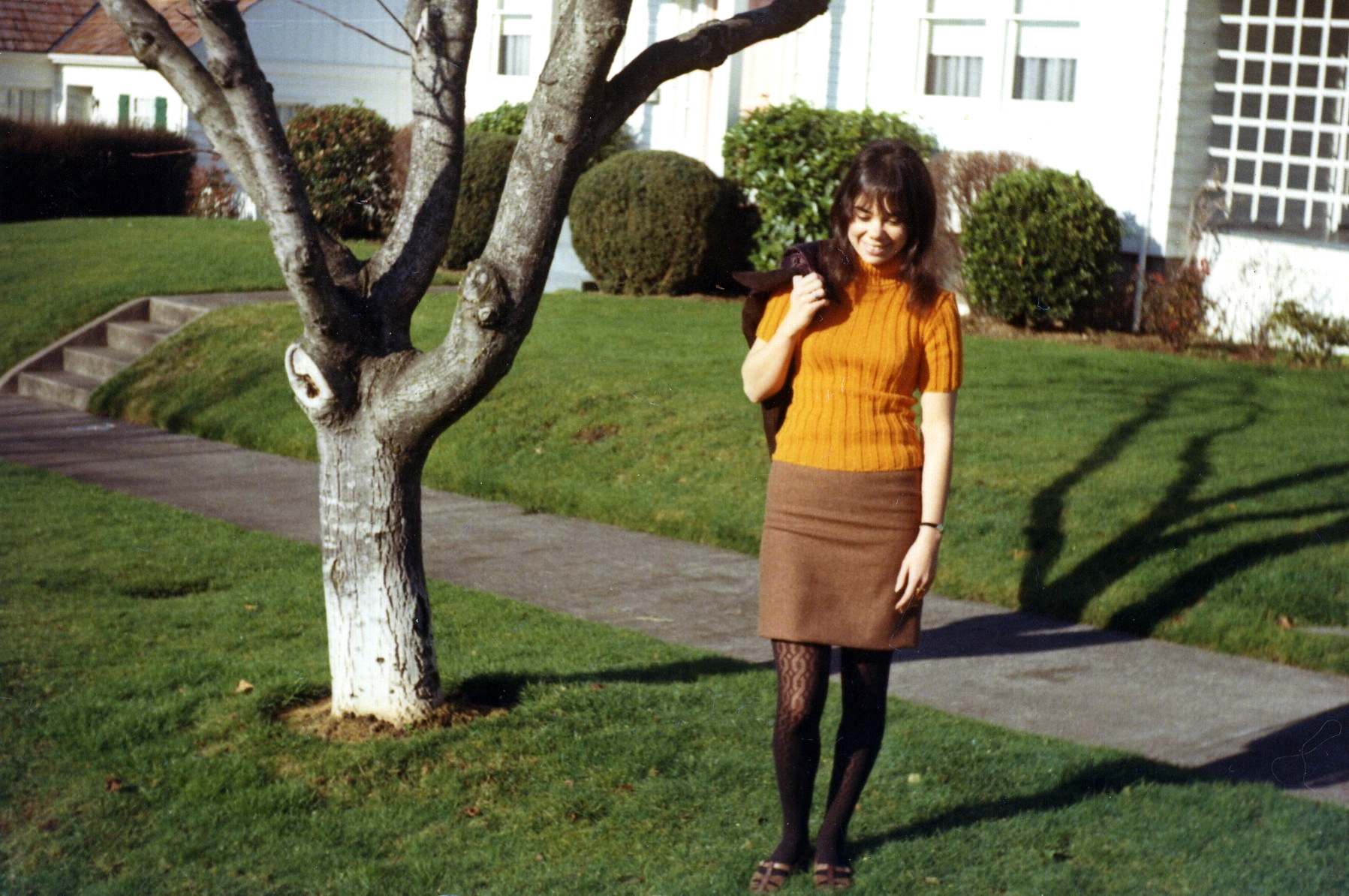
American girl wearing a mini skirt and patterned tights, 1966

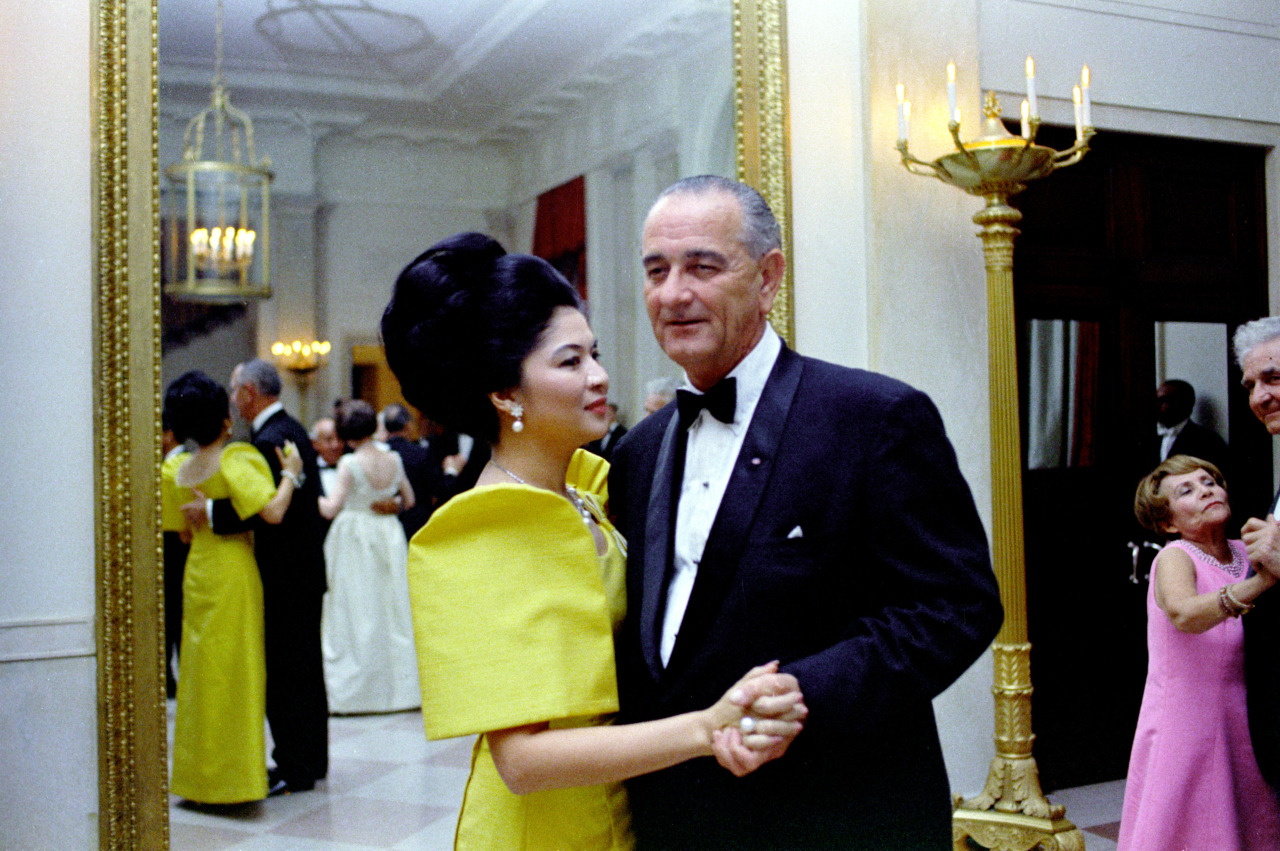
Philippine first lady Imelda Marcos with U.S. President Lyndon B. Johnson while sporting her iconic beehive hairstyle, 1966

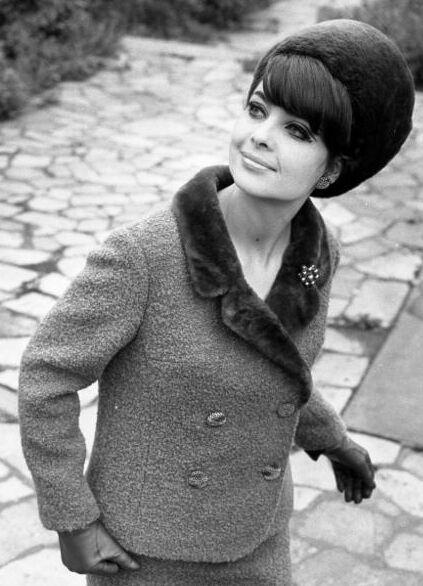
Fashion model from Leipzig, GDR, wearing a wool suit trimmed with fur and a matching fur hat, 1966

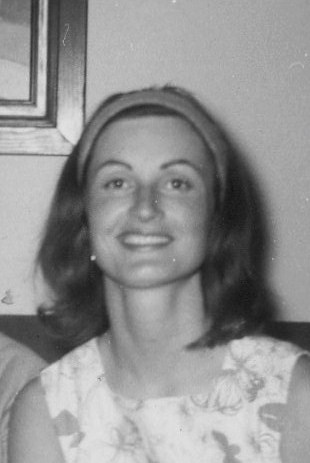
Young woman wears her hair in a headband with flipped ends, 1967.

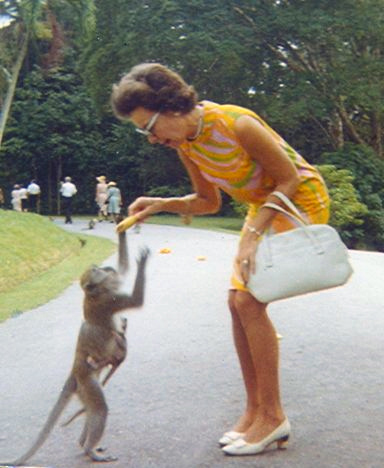
Woman at a Singapore zoo, 1967. Note her Pucci-style print dress.

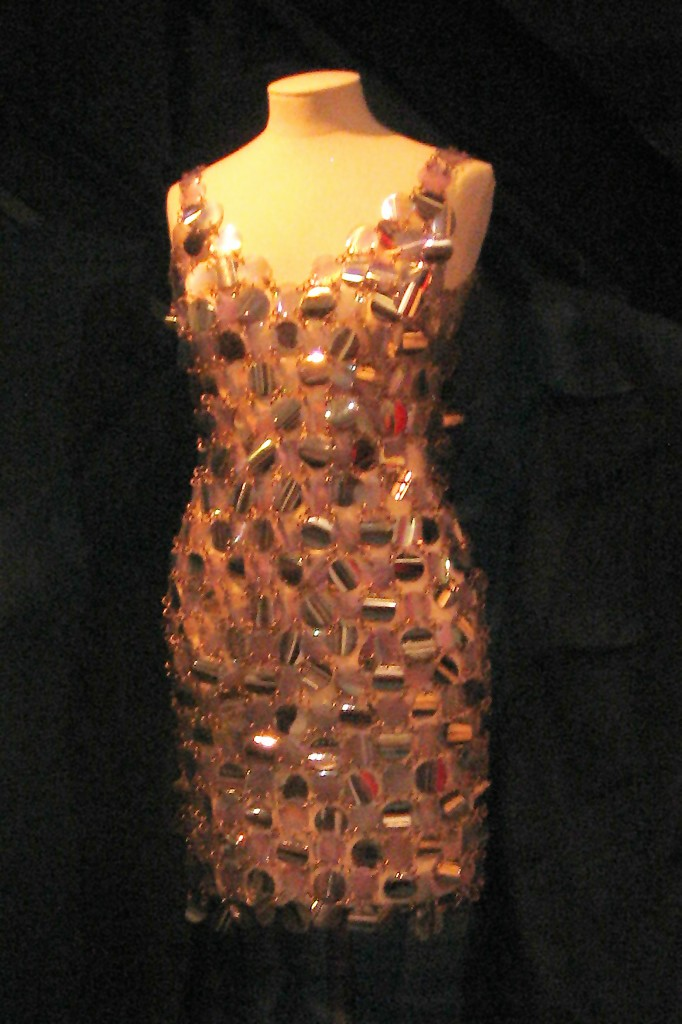
Disc dress by Paco Rabanne, 1967

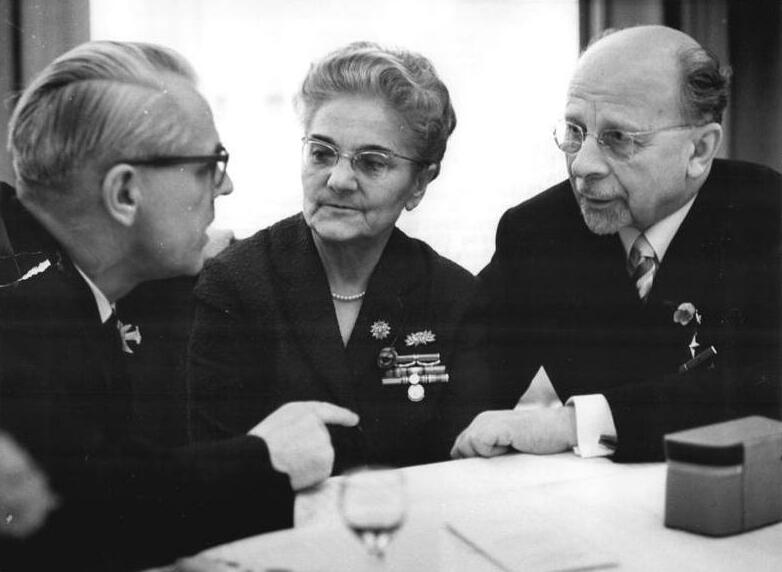
East German politicians wearing horn rimmed glasses, cat eye glasses, and wire rimmed glasses, late 1960s

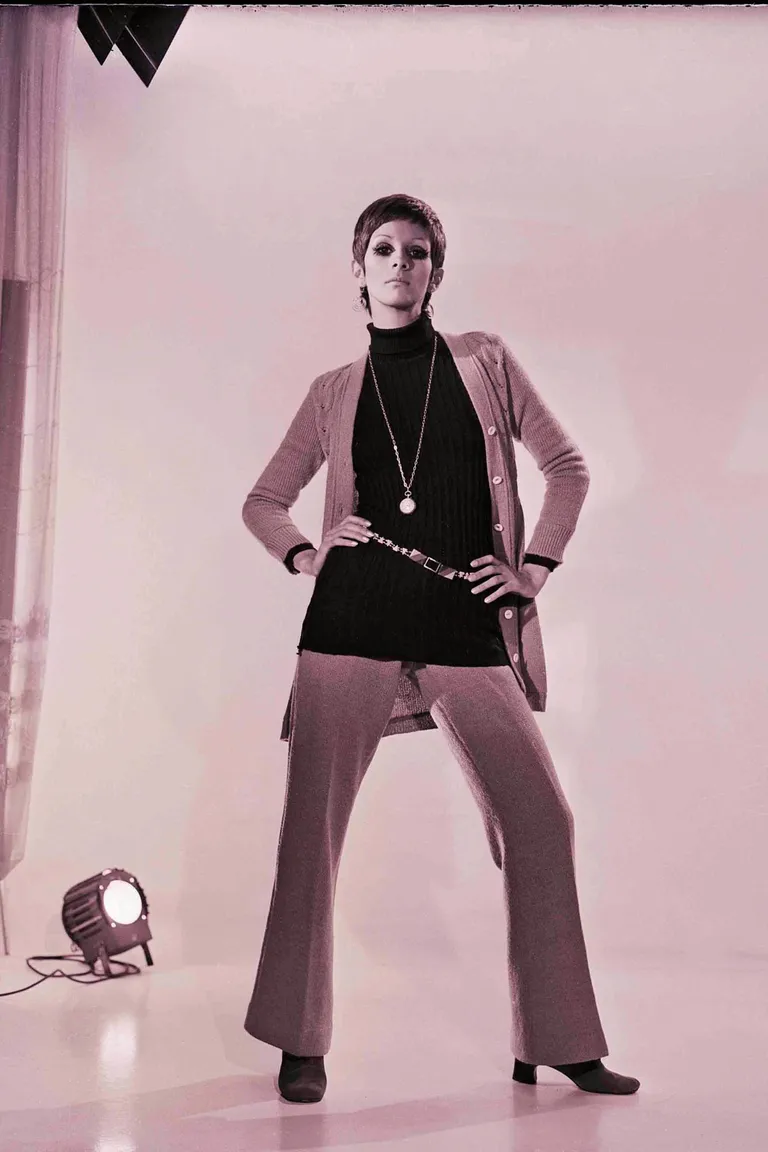
Argentine actress Nacha Guevara c. 1968

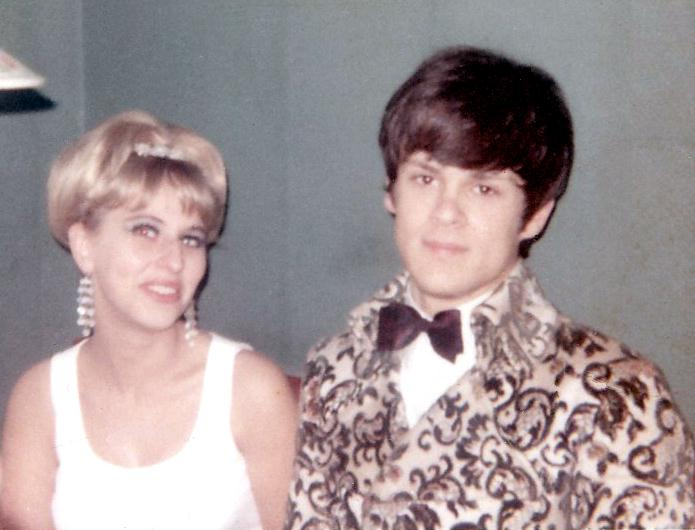
Man wearing a Lord John coat, the popular "dandified" male fashion in 1968

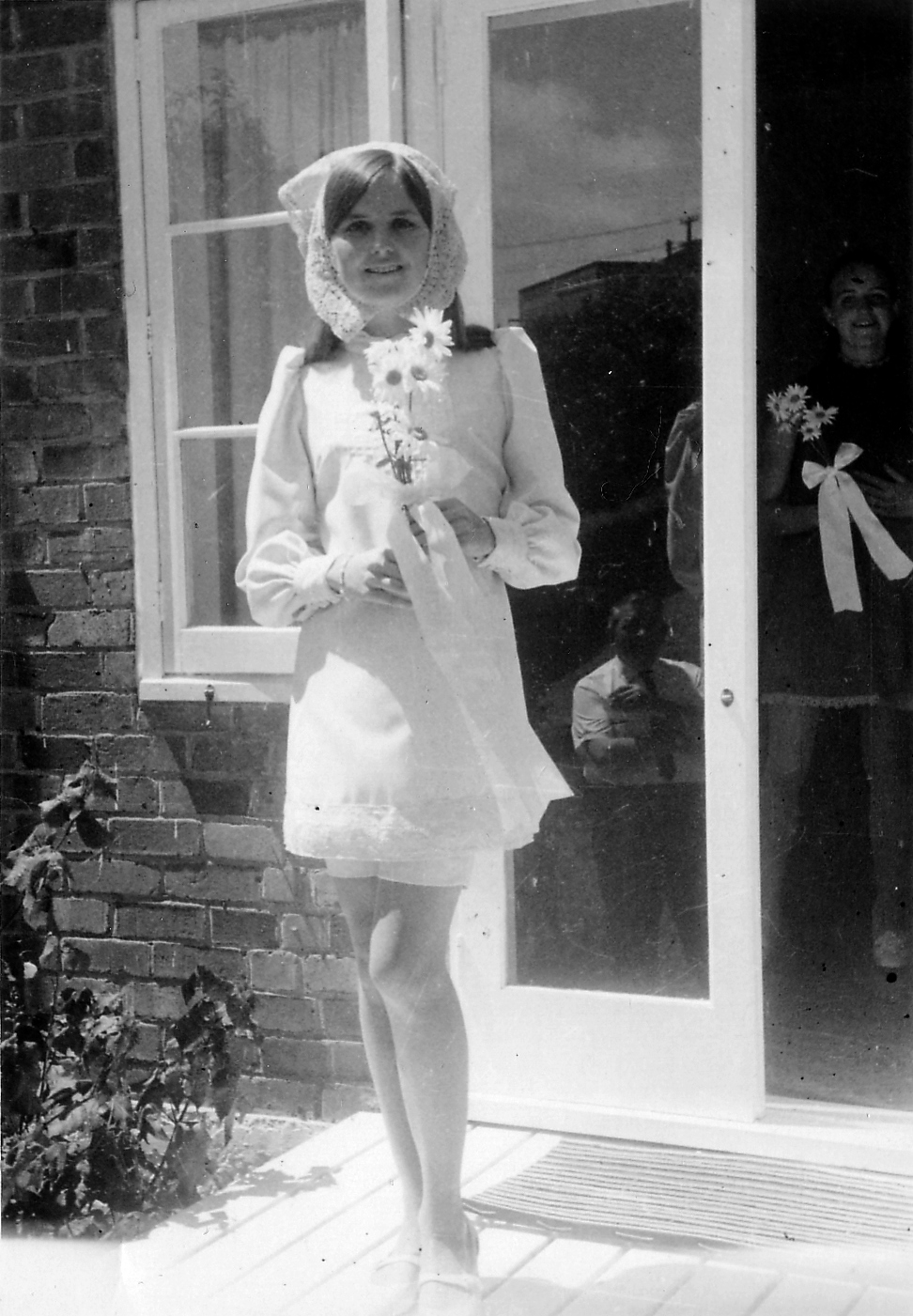
In the late 1960s, brides often wore white mini wedding dresses.

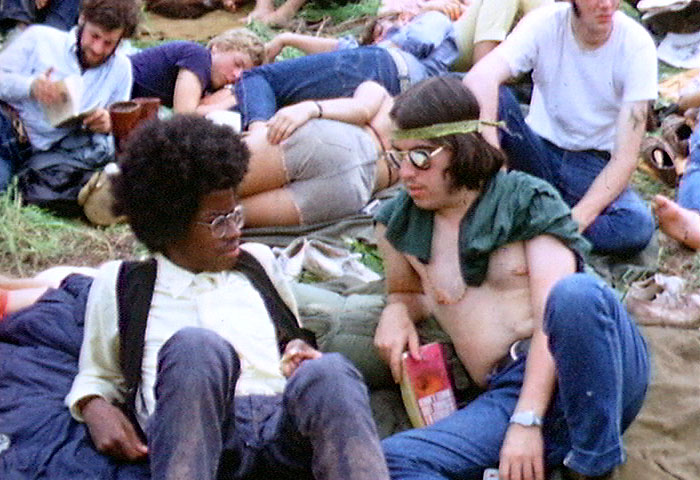
Two men at the Woodstock Festival, 1969

Boy with a mop top hair cut, 1969

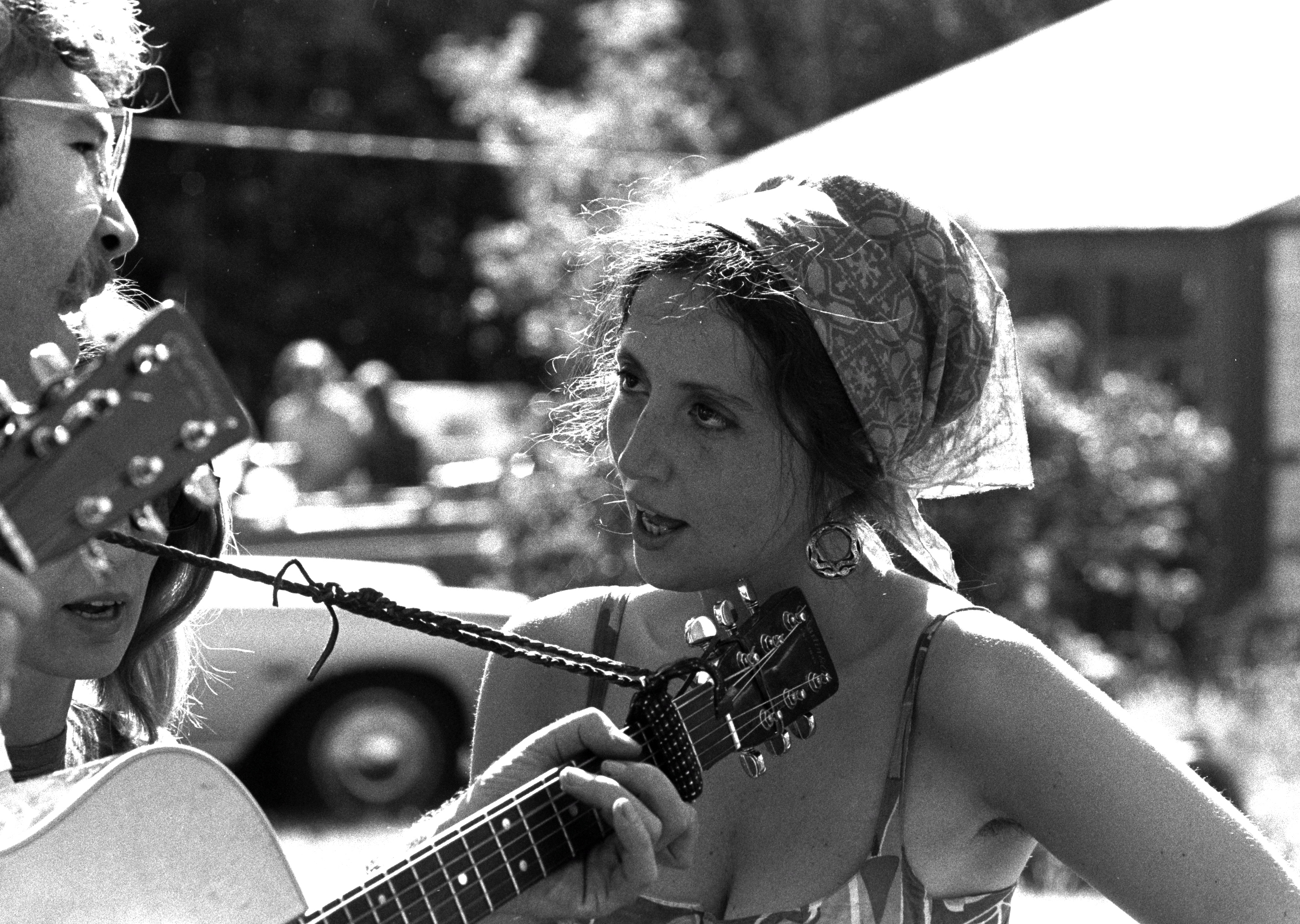
Singer Maria Muldaur in 1968, wearing a gypsy-style kerchief and hoop earrings
