= Serena Sinclair Lesley =

American journalist

- Serena Sinclair Lesley
- Born: Serena Dunn Kamper; March 29, 1926; Santa Barbara, CA
- Died: January 6, 2016 (aged 89); Tualatin, OR
- Education: Wellesley College; Principia College
- Occupation: Journalist
- Spouse(s): Kenneth Sinclair; Earl Lesley
- Writing career
- Subjects: Travel, fashion, youthquake

Serena Dunn Lesley (née Kamper; formerly Sinclair; March 29, 1926 – January 6, 2016) was an American journalist who was the longest serving fashion editor at the London The Daily Telegraph. Writing under the name Serena Sinclair, Lesley covered travel and fashion at The Telegraph from 1960 to 1984. She broadcast on BBC radio and television, and wrote for the Christian Science Monitor.

Lesley was known for her reporting about the revolution referred to as youthquake that occurred in fashion beginning in the 1960s and for it received Fashion Writer Of The Year Award in 1970. Her writing also reflected a new view of the consumer with more emphasis on creating a stylish wardrobe while living on a budget.

== Early life and education ==
Serena Dunn Kamper was born in Santa Barbara, California to Margaret (Dunn) and Gustav Kamper and lived there during her childhood. Lesley was raised in the Christian Science faith. She attended Wellesley College in Massachusetts and graduated from Principia College in Illinois, a private college for Christian Scientists.

== Career ==
=== Early career ===
Kamper began her career at the Santa Barbara News-Press as a general reporter.

=== Fashion editor ===
Lesley was known for her reporting about the revolution referred to as youthquake that occurred in fashion beginning in the 1960s and subsequent change back to more "pulled together" attire. Her writing reflected a new view of the consumer of fashion with more emphasis on the practical aspects of dressing for their changing lifestyles. Her writing about fashion included reflections about the value of the clothes. Influenced by Lesley, The Telegraph began selling stylish clothes by mail order for women living on a tight budget.

== Awards ==
Lesley received the Fashion Writer Of The Year Award in 1970.
