= Youthquake (movement) =

Fashion and cultural movement

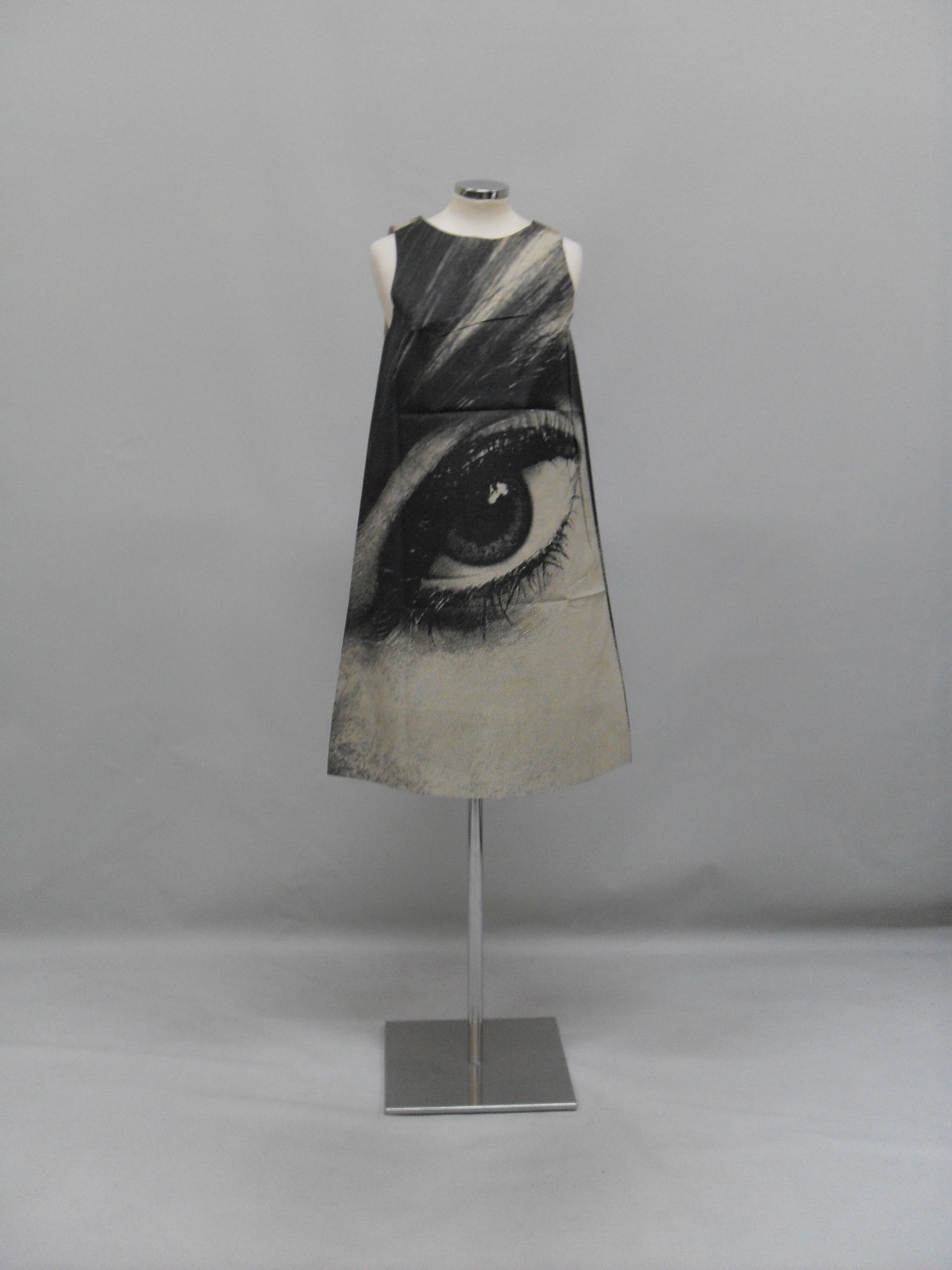
Paper dress

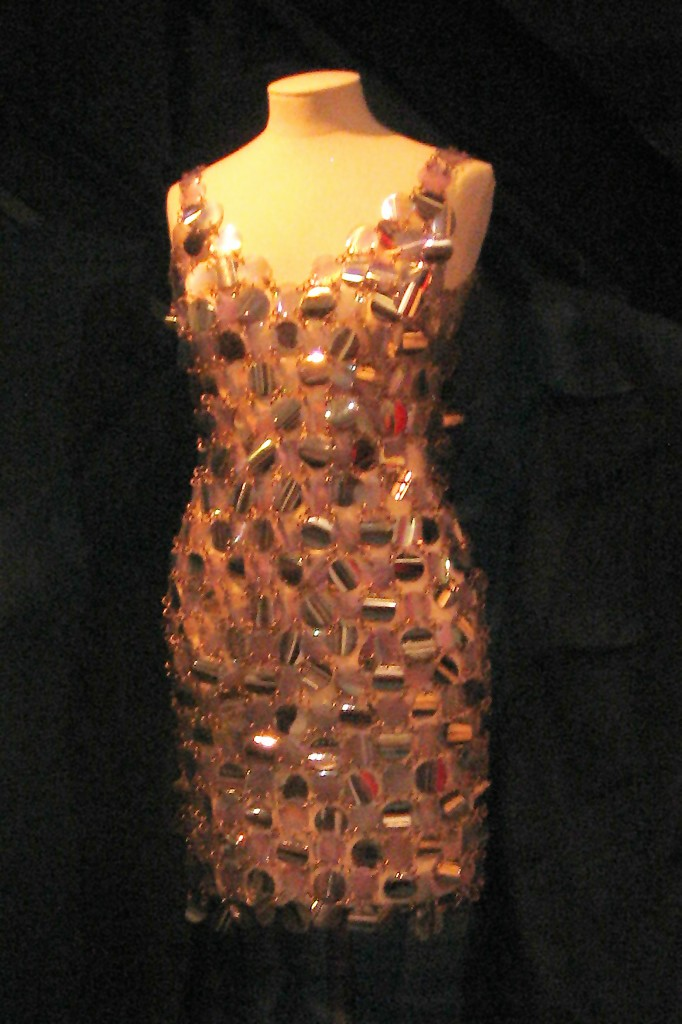
Disc dress by Paco Rabanne

Youthquake was a 1960s cultural movement. The term was coined by Vogue magazine's editor-in-chief Diana Vreeland in 1965. Youthquake involved music and pop culture, and it changed the landscape of the fashion industry. The movement is characterized by looking to youth culture for a source of inspiration, taking dominance away from the English and Parisian couture houses.

== Emergence ==
With the massive market of "baby boomers" coming into young adulthood, this generation challenged the norms of the past and were successful due to their large population. Women's economic, sexual, and social independence is seen as a catalyst that caused the many to reject the idealized femininity of the 1950s. In England, the emerging generation was bored of the couture houses' conservative designs and instead looked to boutiques to reinvent their style. This was a time in society when teenagers were able to explore their own identities and had the freedom to push boundaries due to post-World War II conditions. The boutique saw the start of the London ready-to-wear industry as people flocked for mass-produced clothing at a lower price point than its predecessors.

Mary Quant, often credited for inventing the mini-skirt, was a leader in the boutique movement and attributed her primary source of inspiration to the street style of the youth. Boutiques Biba, Bazaar and Paraphernalia housed talent like Betsey Johnson and Emmanuelle Khanh and utilized mass-production to fill their shops with the latest trends. These boutiques were key players in London and the US as they were the first to cater specifically to the youth market with a modern approach: "clothes displayed like art in a gallery, cooler-than-thou young salesgirls, and rock and roll blaring from the speakers—shops that marketed clothes as part of a whole, deliriously amusing lifestyle". The Scott Paper Company took advantage of mass-production and created disposable chemise dresses out of their patented Dura-Weave paper. Mass-production gave Scott the ability to print a diverse assortment of eye-catching patterns and Pop Art inspired motifs that appealed to the youth consumer.

The fashion of youthquake was fun, spirited and youthful – miniskirts, jumpsuits, and A-line silhouettes in bold colors were all the rage. Trends like mod, Space Age, and hippie styles were birthed from this cultural phenomenon. Poster girls of the youthquakers such as Jean Shrimpton, Twiggy, Penelope Tree, Veruschka, and Edie Sedgwick were often on the cover of fashion magazines such as Vogue. Pop icons like the Beatles, Bob Dylan and Jimi Hendrix were also used in advertising to reinforce fashion trends and drive sales.

== In haute couture ==
Luxury designers like Andrè Courrèges and Yves Saint Laurent came out with mini-skirt infused spring collections in the mid-1960s with bold graphic silhouettes and pants for all occasions. Courrèges' "recognition of the revolution launched by the younger generation" revitalized and preserved high fashion by "injecting [its] elements into Haute Couture". Designers Paco Rabanne and Courrèges experimented with industrial plastics and metallic fibers in exploring the Space Age trend. In the end, many couture houses opened boutiques carrying ready-to-wear styles. In contrast to that, houses like Balenciaga closed their couture doors completely.

== Legacy ==
The concept of the "bubble-up" theory, where ideas and inspiration were taken from the low-context culture instead of the high-context culture setting the standards, was the lasting impact of the youthquake movement. Other legacies included the miniskirt, as it symbolized independence and liberation for women during the time and the trouser suit which inspired the looks of the following decade and redefined femininity. The almost androgynous shapes and aesthetic of the Space Age trend sparked experimentation of form. The use of pop culture icons in fashion advertising set a new precedent for successful marketing into the 21st century.

In December 2017, OxfordDictionaries.com declared the idiom word of the year, noting a five-fold increase in its use during the year, particularly in reference to young people's political engagement.

== See also ==
- Counterculture of the 1960s
- Protests of 1968
- Youth culture
- Edie Sedgwick, original Youthquaker, 'It' girl
- Lana Del Rey, Neo-youthquake
- Phlo Finister, Neo-youthquake
- 2017 UK general election, when a swing in the youth vote to the left was called "youthquake" by many commentators.
