= Disc dress =

The disc dress is a couture dress design associated with the French fashion house Rabanne. The design was created by Rabanne's founder, Paco Rabanne, in 1966, as part of his debut couture collection, Manifesto: Twelve Unwearable Dresses in Contemporary Materials. Widely considered a defining object of Space Age fashion, the design consists of small identical discs of metal or plastic linked together by metal jump rings to form a wearable structure without any conventional fabric, sewing, or needlework.

== Design and construction ==
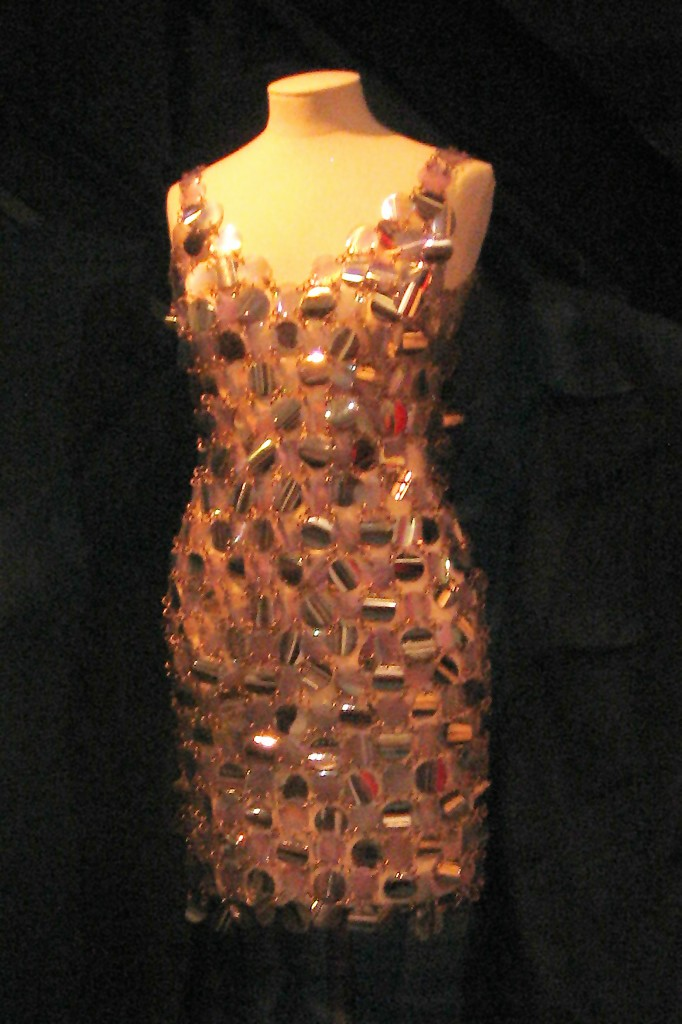
Rabanne disc dress from 1967 on display at the Victoria and Albert Museum

The disc dress exists in two principal variants introduced at different points in Rabanne's career — a plastic disc version and a metal disc version. The plastic version, introduced in the February 1966 collection, is constructed from small iridescent rhodoid plastic discs linked together with metal jump rings, which gave the dresses a shimmering, light-catching appearance. The metal version, first presented in Rabanne's July 1966 collection alongside leather and ring-linked garments, is constructed from small aluminium plates — including square, rectangular, triangular, and circular disc forms — hand-linked one by one with metal wire rings, producing a structure Rabanne described as his "armor look". The construction closely resembles historical chainmail armour, an allusion that was widely noted by fashion critics at the time; Women's Wear Daily wrote of his 1967 collection that his models came out "like Valkyries".

Because the dresses were assembled without the use of sewing, Rabanne worked with pliers rather than needles. Rabanne described his design philosophy in the following terms: "I thought a woman working all day in flat-heeled shoes and sensible suits needed to recapture her mystery and femininity in the evening. It was up to me to supply her with a sort of second skin — rustling, iridescent, phosphorescent, soft yet sharp, supple yet rigid, transparent yet opaque". Rabanne's decision not to use sewing — which he regarded as "slavery" — was criticized by the Paris fashion world as a "subversion of couture". Coco Chanel dismissed Rabanne as a "metal worker", rather than a couturier.

== Reception ==
The disc dress attracted immediate and widespread media attention following the 1966 collection. Rabanne himself attributed his success to the garment's shock value, stating that "my dresses are successful because they are shocking. It's impossible for a woman to wear one and not be noticed". Vogue described the 1966 collection as a "flash of double-daring-do", and called the disc dress "cloth[ing] for intergalactic warriors and social butterflies".

The dresses were adopted rapidly by prominent figures in European and North American popular culture. Françoise Hardy made history in 1968 by wearing a Rabanne gold disc dress, then described as the "most expensive dress in the world". Jane Birkin and Brigitte Bardot were also among the early wearers of Rabanne's chainmail and disc designs. Audrey Hepburn wore a Paco Rabanne dress in Stanley Donen's Two for the Road. Rabanne designed plastic dresses for John Huston's Casino Royale and Jean-Luc Godard's Two or Three Things I Know About Her. Rabanne also designed Jane Fonda's costumes — a series of linked plastic and metal garments — in Roger Vadim's 1968 science fiction film Barbarella.

== Legacy ==
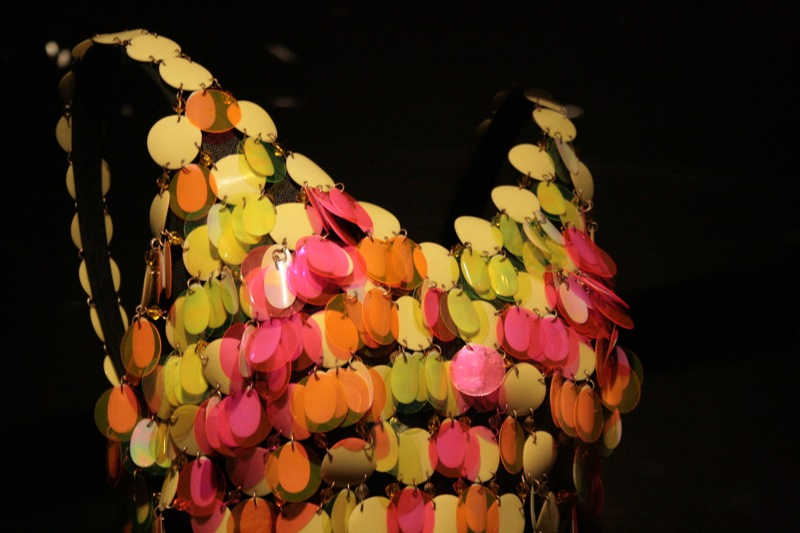
Rabanne disc swimsuit from 1967 on display at the McCord Stewart Museum

The disc dress is regarded as one of the central objects of the Space Age fashion movement of the 1960s. The Metropolitan Museum of Art wrote that "with its allusion to chain mail, the dress epitomizes Rabanne's practice of citing historical elements in a space-age aesthetic".

Both plastic and metal versions of the disc dress are held in several major museum collections. The Metropolitan Museum of Art holds at least two documented examples, a 1966 iridescent plastic disc mini dress and an aluminium plate dress from the Twelve Unwearable Dresses collection. New York City's Museum of Modern Art holds the Barbarella costumes. The Rabanne house, revived after the designer's retirement in 1999 and his death in February 2023, retains the linked disc motif as a signature design element.

In 1996, on the occasion of the thirtieth anniversary of the founding of his fashion house, Rabanne released a limited-edition do-it-yourself version of the disc dress. Packaged in a suitcase-shaped box, the kit contained plastic discs, metal rings, and two logoed clips, allowing the purchaser to assemble their own version of the original 1966 design. As part of Rabanne's spring/summer 2021 collection, then-creative director Julian Dossena designed a range of metallic disc dresses similar to the 1966 collection.
