= Soul surfer =

A soul surfer (term invented during the 1960s) is a surfer who surfs for the sheer pleasure of surfing. Although they may still enter competitions, winning is not the soul surfer's main motive, since they scorn the commercialization of surfing. The term denotes a spirituality of surfing. As Brad Melekian stated in a 2005 article in Surfer magazine:

to pursue surfing not just as an athletic endeavor or as a sunny day diversion, but to try to glean whatever lessons you can from the practice. It means being aware of your surroundings, and respectful of the people and places that you interact with. It means being patient, mindful, kind, compassionate, understanding, active, thoughtful, faithful, hopeful, gracious, disciplined and...good.

The term originates from a 1963 surf instrumental of the same name.

== History ==
The first published mention of the term was in the 1963 surf guitar instrumental "Soul Surfer", by the Southern California surf guitarist Johnny Fortune. The song was intended to reference the then-current soul music genre. The term "soul surfing" gained popularity in the late '60s, with the phrase most used in the mid- and late-'70s. In 1969 surfer and surfboard innovator Tom Blake penned an article entitled "Voice of the Wave", which examined the metaphysical elements of surfing. By the early 70s, curious surfers began to experiment with various Eastern philosophies, such as yoga and meditation.

The concept of the soul surfer was the main focus for the 1987 film North Shore, where the lead character fails to win a major surf competition because someone cheated, yet, unfazed, shrugs his shoulders and remarks that “it doesn’t matter to a soul surfer”. This was also a concept expounded in the 1994 film The Endless Summer II, a documentary which sees two talented surfers go around the world to emulate the original film, The Endless Summer. More recently, the phrase was used as the title of a book about Bethany Hamilton, a young female surfer who continued to surf after her arm was bitten off by a tiger shark. The book was made into a 2011 feature film, also called Soul Surfer.

== See also ==
- Freeriding - a similar concept for snowboarding
