= Colleen Corby =

American model

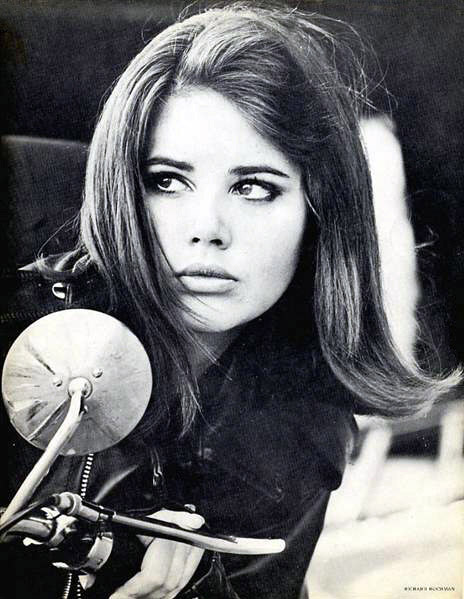
- Corby in the 1960s
- Born: August 3, 1947 (age 79); Wilkes-Barre, Pennsylvania, U.S.
- Modeling information
- Height: 5 ft 7 in (1.70 m)
- Hair color: Dark Brown
- Eye color: Green
- Agency: Ford Models

Colleen Corby (born August 3, 1947) is an American retired model. She is best known for her work as a teen in the 1960s, as well as for her modeling work in department store catalogs from the 1960s and 1970s, including those of Sears, JC Penney, Montgomery Ward, and others. Corby's modeling career began in 1959 when she was eleven years old.

== Biography ==
Two weeks after walking into Eileen Ford's modeling agency (ostensibly to look for a summer job), Corby was sent on her first modeling assignment. By the end of that first summer, she was steadily booking assignments and her parents enrolled her in Manhattan's Professional Children's School, which allows for the irregular schedules of actors and models. By her last year of high school, she was so busy she hardly ever attended classes.

By the mid-1960s, Corby's popularity was at its peak. In 1963, she signed a multi-year movie contract with Universal Pictures, and had every intention of making acting her new career. However, although her acting career never got off the ground, her appeal as a model remained strong; she appeared in TV commercials, magazines and catalogs. Corby was most closely associated with Seventeen magazine, appearing on an unprecedented 15 covers in the 1960s (five times in 1964 alone) and in the magazine's fashion spreads almost every month.

By the 1970s, Corby's teen market was gone, but she continued to appear in magazines like Glamour and Mademoiselle and was a fixture in the catalogs of major retailers like Sears and JCPenney. She initially retired from modeling in 1979, when she married businessman Peter Bernuth. Corby briefly returned to modeling in the early 1980s, but after her second child was born she left New York and the fashion world for good. She currently lives in Florida (where her husband's business was located). Her last public appearance was on The Oprah Winfrey Show. Currently, Corby works in Alumni Relations and Development at the University of Miami School of Business in Coral Gables, Florida.
