= New York's 85th State Assembly district =

American legislative district

Assemblymember
Emerita Torres; D–Soundview

New York's 85th State Assembly district is one of the 150 districts in the New York State Assembly. It has been represented by Emerita Torres since 2025, succeeding Kenny Burgos.

== Geography ==
District 85 is in The Bronx. It covers the South Bronx neighborhoods of Soundview, Clason Point, Longwood, and Hunts Point. The district also includes Rikers Island.

The district overlaps mostly with New York's 14th and a small portion of New York's 15th congressional districts, the 11th, 29th, 32nd and 34th districts of the New York State Senate, and the 17th, 18th and 22nd districts of the New York City Council.

== Recent election results ==
=== 2026 ===
2026 New York State Assembly election, District 85
Party	Candidate	Votes	%
Democratic	Emerita Torres		
Working Families	Emerita Torres		
Total	Emerita Torres (incumbent)		
Write-in			
Total votes			100.0

=== 2024 ===
Kenny Burgos resigned from the Assembly on July 19, after the June 25th primary, when he was renominated. Due to that, on July 24, the Bronx Democratic Party nominated Emerita Torres, a former diplomat.

2024 New York State Assembly election, District 85
Party	Candidate	Votes	%
Democratic	Emerita Torres	20,881	78.9
Republican	Kelly Atkinson	4,849	18.3
Conservative	Gary Lutz	685	2.6
Write-in		61	0.2
Total votes		26,476	100.0
Democratic hold			

=== 2022 ===
2022 New York State Assembly election, District 85
Party	Candidate	Votes	%
Democratic	Kenny Burgos	10,859	
Working Families	Kenny Burgos	519	
Total	Kenny Burgos (incumbent)	11,378	84.6
Republican	Laurine Berry	2,062	15.3
Write-in		10	0.1
Total votes		13,450	100.0
Democratic hold			

=== 2020 ===
2020 New York State Assembly election, District 85
Primary election
Party	Candidate	Votes	%
Democratic	Kenny Burgos	5,778	61.5
Democratic	William Moore	3,573	38.1
Write-in		37	0.4
Total votes		9,388	100.0
General election
Democratic	Kenny Burgos	27,924	88.1
Republican	Janelle King	3,065	9.7
Conservative	Gabriel Eronosele	650	2.1
Write-in		42	0.1
Total votes		31,681	100.0
Democratic hold			

=== 2018 ===
2018 New York State Assembly election, District 85
Party	Candidate	Votes	%
Democratic	Marcos Crespo (incumbent)	20,783	95.4
Republican	Shonde Lennon	805	3.7
Conservative	Joseph Bogdany	167	0.8
Write-in		23	0.1
Total votes		21,778	100.0
Democratic hold			

=== 2016 ===
2016 New York State Assembly election, District 85
Primary election
Party	Candidate	Votes	%
Democratic	Marcos Crespo (incumbent)	2,635	72.9
Democratic	William Moore	972	26.9
Write-in		8	0.2
Total votes		3,615	100.0
General election
Democratic	Marcos Crespo (incumbent)	25,812	93.2
Republican	Janelle King	1,033	3.7
Green	Daniel Zuger	419	1.5
Conservative	Barbara Santander	408	1.5
Write-in		22	0.1
Total votes		27,694	100.0
Democratic hold			

=== 2014 ===
2014 New York State Assembly election, District 85
Primary election
Party	Candidate	Votes	%
Democratic	Marcos Crespo (incumbent)	2,745	75.6
Democratic	William Moore	874	24.1
Write-in		10	0.3
Total votes		3,629	100.0
General election
Democratic	Marcos Crespo (incumbent)	9,408	91.9
Republican	Janelle King	357	3.5
Write-in	William Moore	189	1.8
Conservative	Barbara Santander	180	1.8
Green	Daniel Zuger	91	0.9
Write-in		9	0.1
Total votes		10,234	100.0
Democratic hold			

=== 2012 ===
2012 New York State Assembly election, District 85
Party	Candidate	Votes	%
Democratic	Marcos Crespo	24,605	
Working Families	Marcos Crespo	392	
Total	Marcos Crespo (incumbent)	24,997	95.9
Republican	Janelle King	620	2.4
Conservative	Eduardo Ramirez	324	1.2
Green	Daniel Zuger	122	0.5
Write-in		2	0.0
Total votes		26,065	100.0
Democratic hold			

=== 2010 ===
2010 New York State Assembly election, District 85
Primary election
Party	Candidate	Votes	%
Democratic	Marcos Crespo (incumbent)	2,858	73.6
Democratic	Israel Cruz	1,003	25.8
Write-in		22	0.6
Total votes		3,883	100.0
General election
Democratic	Marcos Crespo (incumbent)	11,213	93.7
Republican	Leopold Paul	438	3.7
Conservative	Arturo Santiago Jr.	305	2.6
Write-in		4	0.0
Total votes		11,960	100.0
Democratic hold			

=== 2009 special ===
2009 New York State Assembly special election, District 85
Party	Candidate	Votes	%
Democratic	Marcos Crespo	1,277	
Working Families	Marcos Crespo	54	
Total	Marcos Crespo	1,331	92.6
Republican	Leopold Paul	106	7.4
Write-in		0	0.0
Total votes		1,437	100.0
Democratic hold			
