= Bernice Manocherian =

American lobbyist

Bernice Manochehrian
- Born: 1930 (age 95–96)
- Known for: President of the American Israel Public Affairs Committee
- Spouse: Eskander Manocherian
- Children: 4
- Family: Fraydun Manocherian (brother-in-law)

Bernice Manochehrian (born 1930) is the former President of the American Israel Public Affairs Committee.

== Biography ==
Manocherian is a member of AIPAC's National Board of Directors and project manager for the Whitehall Development Corporation.

== Personal life ==
She was married to Eskander Manochehrian, managing partner of Manocherian Brothers, a New York-based real-estate development and management firm, and a vice president of the Rent Stabilization Association of New York. They had four children: sons, Jeffrey (born 1952) and Donald (born 1958), and daughters Cynthia (born 1962) and Dr. Darel Manocherian Benaim. Her husband died in 1999. Her son Jeffrey Manocherian is president of Manocherian Brothers and is married to Cynthia Moses, daughter of Community Housing Improvement Program founder and real estate developer William A. Moses. Her brother-in-law is real estate developer Fraydun Manocherian.
