= Paco Rabanne =

Spanish fashion designer (1934–2023)

- Rabanne in 2006
- Born: Francisco Rabaneda Cuervo; 18 February 1934; Pasaia, Spain
- Died: 3 February 2023 (aged 88); Ploudalmézeau, France
- Education: l'École Nationale des Beaux-Arts
- Occupation: Fashion designer
- Website: www.pacorabanne.com

Francisco Rabaneda Cuervo (18 February 1934 – 3 February 2023), more commonly known under the pseudonym of Paco Rabanne (French: [pako ʁaban]; Spanish: [ˈpako raˈβan]), was a Spanish-born naturalised-French fashion designer.

Rabanne rose to prominence as an enfant terrible of the fashion world in the 1960s with his use of unconventional materials such as metal and plastic in his clothing, and for his incorporation of futuristic elements in his designs, gaining notoriety for his space-age style. He collaborated with a range of iconic fashion houses and designed costumes for films. Rabanne was also the recipient of several awards, including the Legion of Honour, which recognised his contributions to the arts and fashion.

In addition to his fashion work, Rabanne was known for his fragrances. He created a number of highly successful scents, including Paco Rabanne Pour Homme, XS (Excess), Invictus, 1 Million, and Lady Million.

== Early life and education ==
Rabanne was born on 18 February 1934 in the Spanish Basque town of Pasaia, Gipuzkoa province. His father, a Republican Colonel, was executed by Francoist troops during the Spanish Civil War. Rabanne's mother was a chief seamstress at Cristóbal Balenciaga's first couture house in San Sebastián, Basque Country, and in 1939, when he was aged 5, they escaped the civil war by fleeing to France where he assumed the name "Paco Rabanne". In the mid-1950s Paris, while studying architecture at l'École Nationale des Beaux-Arts, Rabanne earned money making fashion sketches for Dior and Givenchy, and shoe sketches for Charles Jourdan. He nevertheless subsequently took a job with France's foremost developer of reinforced concrete, Auguste Perret, working there for over ten years.

== Career ==
=== Fashion ===
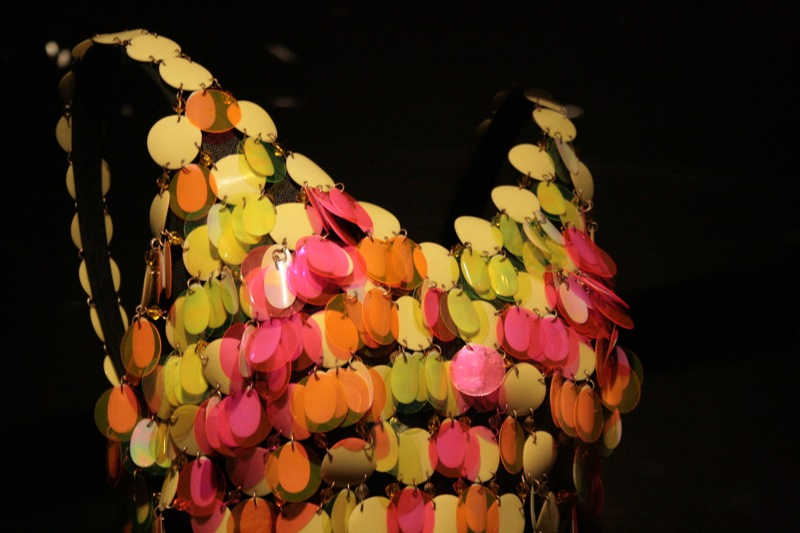
1967 Rabanne metal and sequin swimsuit

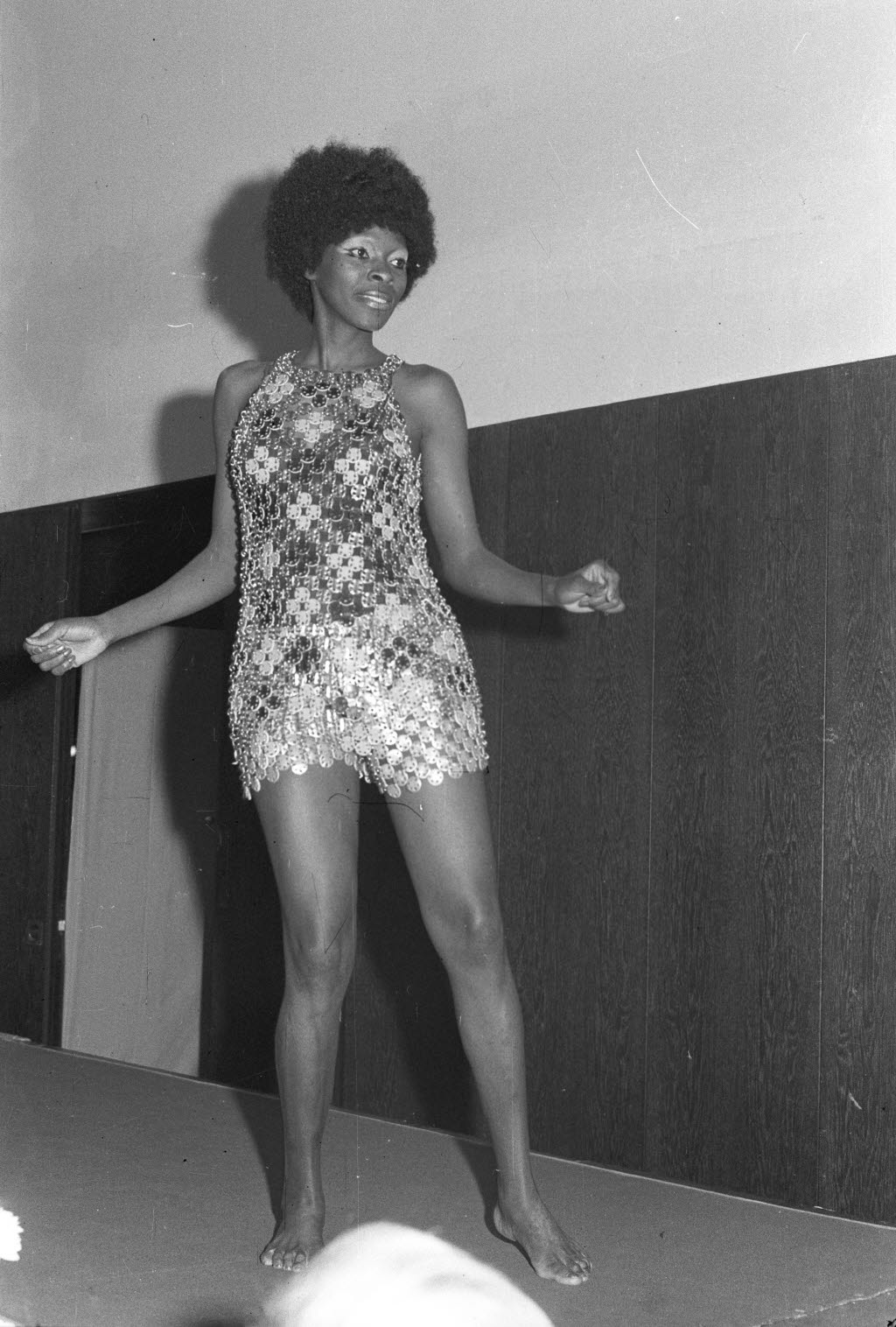
1971 Rabanne metal mail outfit in a fashion show, Germany

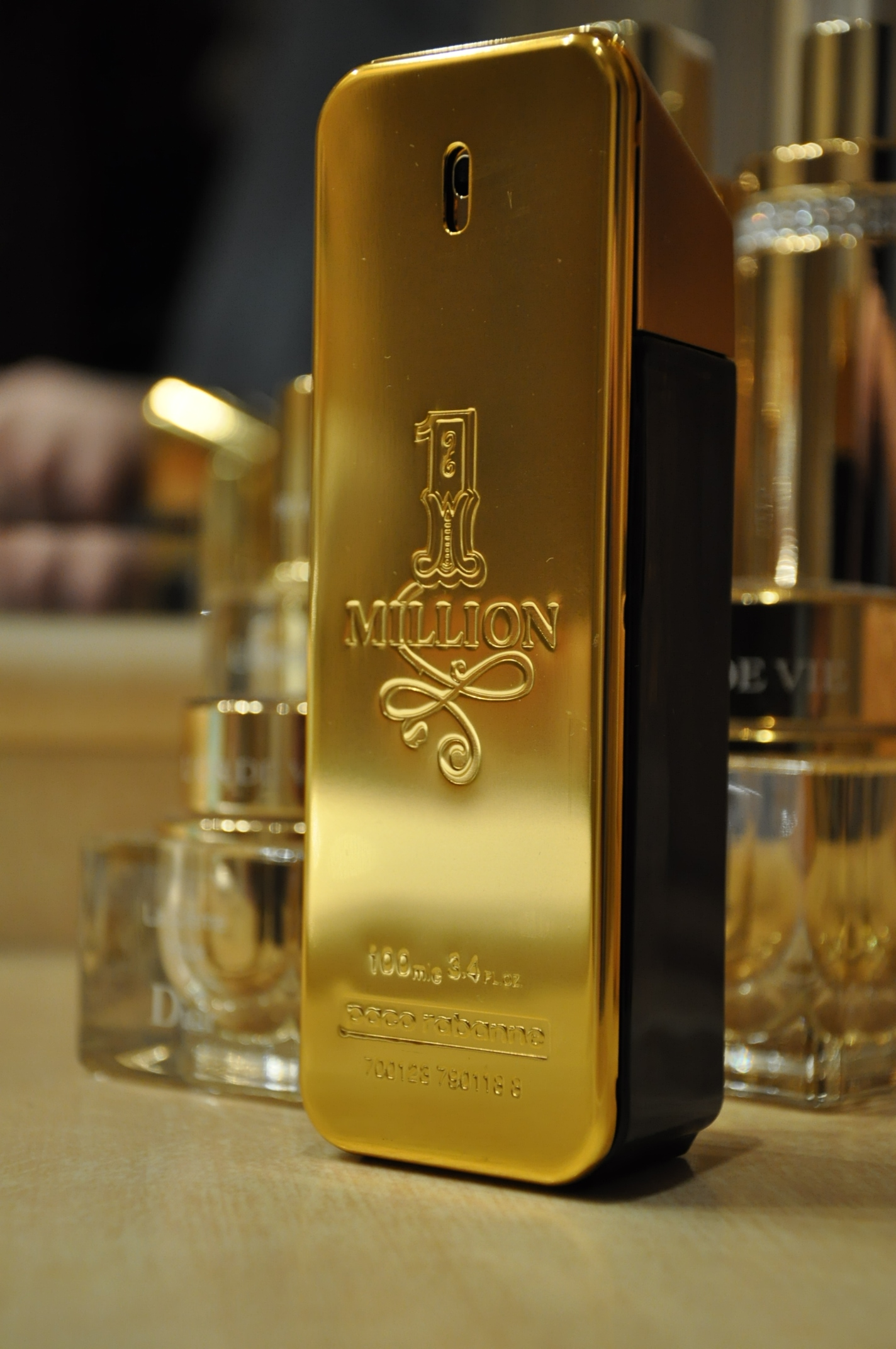
Rabanne's 1 Million eau de toilette spray

He started his career in fashion by creating jewellery for Givenchy, Dior, and Balenciaga and founded his own fashion house in 1966. He used unconventional materials such as metal, paper, and plastic for his metal couture and outlandish and flamboyant designs. For the debut of his namesake brand in 1966, he presented "Manifesto: 12 unwearable dresses in contemporary materials". Although he didn't consider himself a futurist, Rabanne's most famous contribution to the fashion industry was arguably his futurist space age designs. People Magazine journalist Hedy Philips noted that these space-age designs "turned the fashion world upside down".

Rabanne is known for designing the iconic green dress, as well as the other costumes, worn by Jane Fonda in the 1968 science-fiction film Barbarella. The singer song-writer Françoise Hardy was a big fan of Rabanne's designs. For Tour 1996 and the resulting Live à Bercy album, singer Mylène Farmer commissioned Rabanne to create her live-concert stage costumes.

In 1966, Rabanne was named one of the "fashion revolutionaries" in New York by Women's Wear Daily, alongside Edie Sedgwick, Tiger Morse, Pierre Cardin, Baby Jane Holzer, Rudi Gernreich, André Courrèges, Emanuel Ungaro, Yves Saint Laurent, and Mary Quant.

In November 2010, Rabanne was awarded the Legion of Honour by France's minister of culture, Frédéric Mitterrand. During the award ceremony, Mitterrand highlighted Rabanne's early work, particularly his first collection of "12 unwearable dresses".

=== Fragrance ===
In 1968, Rabanne began collaborating with the fragrance company Puig, which resulted in the company marketing his perfumes. In 1969, his first – and arguably most popular – scent, called Calandre, would be released. In 1976, the company built a perfume factory in Chartres, France. In the 1980s, in Brazil, his men's perfume brand registration was forfeited due to a court judgement that the brand was never officially present in Brazil despite heavy advertising and a strong local awareness. The court reasoned that because Puig's local distributor was smuggling perfume into Brazil, the company could not show proof of payment of import duties. It took six or seven years to recover his brand name in Brazil. In 1994, Rabanne first released his scent called XS. The fragrance 1 Million, released in 2008, was the last scent that Rabanne played a role in developing and is considered to be one of the most popular men's fragrances worldwide. Lady Million, a fragrance recognisable by its distinctive golden bottles, also held a strong presence in the market as of 2023. As of 28 June 2023, his first name Paco was dropped from the line, which is now known simply as Rabanne.

== Other interests ==
In 1994, Rabanne wrote the book, Has the Countdown Begun? Through Darkness to Enlightenment.

In 2005, Rabanne opened the first exhibition of his drawings in Moscow, Russia. His reasoning for showing the drawings then was, "I am 72 years old, and I wanted to present my drawings this year before disappearing from this planet. I have not shown them to anyone except Salvador Dalí 30 years ago, who told me to keep going." One of the black-and-white sketches depicts a child letting go of a dove and a white balloon into the sky, which he said was inspired by the commemoration ceremony for the 2004 Beslan attack in Beslan, North Ossetia, in which 319 hostages were killed, including 186 children, 12 servicemen, and 31 hostage-takers. Rabanne wanted the money that the drawing sold for to go to the women of Beslan.

In 2006, Rabanne visited Kyiv, Ukraine. He summed up the changes since the Orange Revolution: "Ukraine reminds me of a flower unfolding its petals before my very eyes."

In 2011 Manish Arora was named chief designer of Rabanne menswear. Then in 2012 he was replaced in that role by the German fashion designer Lydia Maurer. In mid-2013, Belgian and former Balenciaga designer Julien Dossena was appointed creative director of womenswear at Paco Rabanne. Dossena's designs were subsequently praised by fashion critics. The ateliers are located in Paris above the flagship store of Nina Ricci, another Puig fashion company, on Avenue Montaigne. In January 2016, a new store opened on Paris' Rue Cambon, following the closure of the remaining Paco Rabanne boutiques more than ten years earlier.

A re-edit of his classic "le 69" bag was relaunched by Comme des Garçons.

== Personal life and death ==
Rabanne gained notoriety for making eccentric public statements. He claimed he had lived several lives (including that of a prostitute in the time of Louis XV), to have known Jesus in a previous life, to have seen God three times, to have been visited by extraterrestrials, to have murdered Tutankhamun, and to be 75,000 years old.

In 1999, he announced that, at the age of seventeen, he had visions of Parisians in flames throwing themselves into the Seine and that after studying other concordant prophecies, he came to the conclusion that the Mir space station was going to crash in France at the time of the solar eclipse of 11 August 1999, its debris causing thousands of deaths in Paris and in the Gers region. On 10 May 1999, he publicly vowed not to make any more predictions if Mir did not crash into Paris on 11 August 1999. However, he claimed to have had an apparition of the Virgin Mary telling him to continue the predictions.

Rabanne died at his home in Portsall, Ploudalmézeau, France, on 3 February 2023, aged 88.

== See also ==
- André Courrèges
- Diana Dew
- Rudi Gernreich
- Betsey Johnson
- Tiger Morse
- Mary Quant
- Vogue World 2024
