= William A. Moses =

American real estate developer (1933–2002)

- Born: 1933; Brooklyn, New York
- Died: January 3, 2002 (age 71); Manhattan, New York
- Education: B.A. Syracuse University; M.B.A. Columbia University
- Occupation: Real estate developer
- Known for: Founder of the Community Housing Improvement Program
- Spouses: Joan "Tiger" Morse (divorced) Hannah Kaufmann (divorced) Bernice Schwartz (divorced)
- Children: 3
- Parent: Samuel Moses
- Relatives: Morris Henry Sugarman (former father-in-law)

William A. Moses (1933 – January 3, 2002) was an American real estate developer, founder of the Community Housing Improvement Program, and an advocate against rent control.

== Biography ==
Moses was born in a Jewish family in Brooklyn, the son of real estate owner Samuel Moses. He graduated from The High School of Music and Art. He served in the Navy during World War II and is a graduate of both Syracuse University and Columbia University where he received an M.B.A. in 1952. Moses took over the real estate company founded by his father, which owned and managed apartment properties. Moses opposed rent control and successfully lobbied the state government in the early 1970s to end rent control and rent stabilization which was reversed by the state Legislature three years later. In 1966, Moses founded the Community Housing Improvement Program, a trade association that represents the owners of over 4,000 apartment buildings in New York City. Moses believed that "Rent control is the principal reason for neighborhood deterioration" and that "more than 300,000 apartments housing one million people" would have been built arguing that landlords who do not receive enough income to maintain their buildings will let them deteriorate. He also served as vice president of the Rent Stabilization Association of New York.

== Personal life ==
Moses married three times, all of which ended in divorce. His first wife was fashion designer Joan "Tiger" Morse (daughter of architect Morris Henry Sugarman); they had one son, Henry Winston Moses, before divorcing. In 1960, he married his second wife, Hannah Kaufmann; they had two children, Andrew Ferdinand Moses and daughter Cynthia Moses-Manocherian (married to Jeff Manocherian, son of AIPAC president Bernice Manocherian and nephew of real estate developer Fraydun Manocherian). His third wife was Bernice Schwartz. Moses died on January 3, 2002, at his home in Manhattan. Services were held at Temple Emanu-El in Manhattan.
