= Manocherian Brothers =

Manhattan real estate company

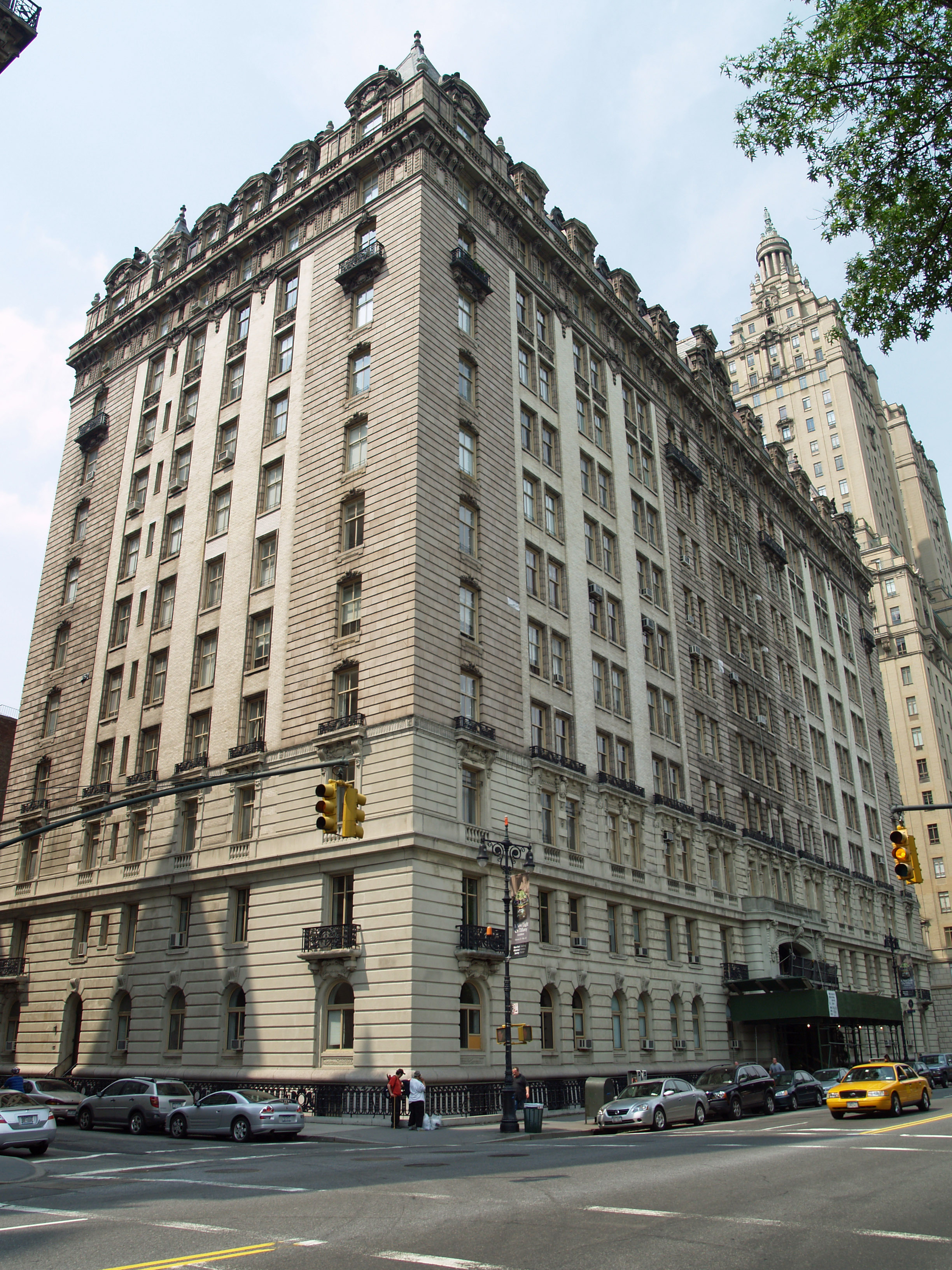
- The Langham, a Manocherian Brothers building.
- Company type: Privately held company
- Area served: New York City
- Website: manocherianbrothers.com

Manocherian Brothers is a privately held real estate investment and development firm based in New York City. Along with its sister company, Pan Am Equities, the firm is owned and operated by the Manocherian family, who have been active players in the city's real estate market since the 1930s. The company specializes in acquiring, developing, and managing multifamily residential properties, particularly on the Upper East Side of Manhattan.

The Manocherian Brothers' real estate holdings include several high-profile residential and commercial properties across New York City. Among their most well-known properties are:

- One Astor Place - A residential and commercial building located in NoHo
- 210 Fifth Avenue - A commercial property located near Madison Square Park
- 201 East 12th Street - An East Village residential property with an award-winning restoration
- 420 East 79th Street – A 16-story residential building with 112 units, located on Manhattan's Upper East Side
- Empire House (200 East 71st Street) - A residential property on Manhattan's Upper East Side
- The Langham - One of the company's flagship properties, known for its high-end residential offerings, with such high-profile tenants as Mia Farrow and Carly Simon

== History ==
The company was founded by brothers Manoocher, Amir, Eskandar, and Fraydun Manocherian, members of a prominent Iranian family who immigrated to the United States in the 1930s. Over the decades, the family established itself as a key player in New York City's real estate industry, leveraging strategic acquisitions and development projects to build a portfolio of residential and commercial properties.

== Expansion and Additional Investments ==
Beyond New York City, the company has expanded its holdings into other major urban markets. In 2012, a subsidiary of the company acquired the historic Bond Building in Washington, D.C. for $22 million. In 2016, a partner invested in a Miami property. In 2024, the firm filed plans for a new major development on the Upper East Side.
