= Morris Henry Sugarman =

American architect (1889–1946)

- Born: December 15, 1889; Odessa, Kherson Governorate, Russian Empire
- Died: October 12, 1946 (aged 56); Manhattan, New York, U.S.
- Education: Columbia University
- Occupation: Architect
- Spouse: Marcia Sugarman (divorced)
- Children: Joan "Tiger" Morse
- Relatives: William A. Moses (son-in-law)

Morris Henry Sugarman (December 15, 1889 – October 12, 1946) was a Russian-born American architect. He co-founded the architecture firm, Sugarman & Berger with Albert C. Berger (1879–1940).

== Biography ==
Sugarman was born on December 15, 1889, in Odessa in Kherson Governorate of the Russian Empire (present-day Ukraine). He was the son of Marianne and Samuel Sugarman. He studied at the National Academy of Design at Columbia University, and in England and in France.

In 1925, he was awarded the gold medal from the American Institute of Architects (AIA). He organized the architectural firm Sugarman & Berger in 1926. Together they designed the New Yorker Hotel, the Roerich Museum in New York City, the Fifth Avenue Hotel in New York City, the Mayfair Hotel in Philadelphia, Navarre Building in New York City, the Long Beach Hospital on Long Island, as well as buildings in Europe and Central America.

Sugarman died on October 12, 1946, after an illness at Doctors Hospital in Manhattan. His daughter was the fashion designer Joan "Tiger" Morse (who married, and was divorced from real estate developer William A. Moses).
