= Tiger Morse =

American fashion designer (1931–1972)

- Born: Joan Sugarman; April 23, 1931; New York City, U.S.
- Died: April 22, 1972 (aged 40); New York City, U.S.
- Other names: Joan Marion Sand, Joan Tiger Morse, Joan Morse
- Occupations: Fashion designer; businessperson; socialite; costume designer
- Movement: Avant-garde
- Spouse: William A. Moses (divorced)
- Children: 1
- Father: Morris Henry Sugarman
- Website: www.tigermorse.com

Joan "Tiger" Morse (April 23, 1931 – April 22, 1972), was an American fashion designer, businessperson and socialite. She was known for her 1960s avant-garde clothing design and had owned a few boutique shops in New York City, with celebrity clients. Morse was the subject of the Andy Warhol film, Tiger Morse (Reel 14 of ****) (1967). She also worked as a costume designer for John Chamberlain film The Secret Life of Hernando Cortez (1968). Morse lived most of her life in New York City, with a period in London in late life.

== Early life and education ==
Joan Sugarman was born on April 23, 1931, in New York City, the daughter of Marcia Sand (née Freedman), and Russian Empire-born architect Morris Henry Sugarman. Her family was Jewish and her parents divorced in 1944. She attended the Lincoln School, and the Cherry Lawn School in Darien, Connecticut.

Morse attended Syracuse University and Sorbonne University. She legally changed her name to Joan M. Sand (her mother's maiden name), before her engagement in 1951 to William A. Moses.

== Career ==
Morse was the proprietress of the "A La Carte" starting in 1955, later known as the "Kaleidoscope" starting in 1964. It was located on East 58th Street in Manhattan. She also owned Tiger's Toys and the "Teeny Weeny", a boutique located on Madison Avenue at 73rd Street in New York City. She sold ready-to-wear, and made-to-measure clothing. She also designed shoes and boots. In 1967, Morse was working on designing clothing with kinetics (early electronic clothing) for the "psychedelic collection". Her stores were decorated eccentrically. Amongst her clients were Jacqueline Kennedy Onassis, Florence Knoll Bassett, Jean Harvey Vanderbilt, and Twiggy.

In her early career Morse was interested in working with saris, kimonos, and textiles from Asia. In 1962, Morse was featured in an eight page spread in Life magazine, with photographs by Mark Shaw, where she was attending to a textile buying trip in multiple locations in Asia.

Her work shifted in the early 1960s towards fluorescent colors and more dramatic dress silhouettes; signaling an early change towards counterculture fashion. Her other interests included miniskirts and mini dresses, oversized sunglasses, paper dresses, "little girl dresses" (i.e., babydoll dresses) made with creative fabrics, artificially colored furs, mod fashion, mirrors and mirror balls, "Uncle Sam" themed clothes, and vinyl clothing. Her 1966 fashion show was held in her friend Jan Yoors artist loft in Manhattan, and featured black lights, fluorescent clothing, and a catwalk suspended above the audience; it was attended by Andy Warhol and the Factory, Edie Sedgwick, Halston, and others. Morse was named one of the "fashion revolutionaries" in New York by Women's Wear Daily in 1966, alongside Edie Sedgwick, Baby Jane Holzer, Pierre Cardin, Paco Rabanne, Rudi Gernreich, André Courrèges, Emanuel Ungaro, Yves Saint Laurent, and Mary Quant. In 1967, Morse was working on designing clothing with kinetics (early electronic clothing) for the "psychedelic collection".

She was a costume designer for the John Chamberlain film The Secret Life of Hernando Cortez (1968), filmed in Mexico starring Ultra Violet and Taylor Mead.

== Death and legacy ==
She moved to London towards the end of her life. Morse was a known amphetamine addict, and died on April 22, 1972, at age 40 from a drug overdose while visiting New York City. She had been married multiple times, and had one son, Henry Winston Moses.

Her fashion work is in museum collections including at the Museum of the City of New York; and the Metropolitan Museum of Art. She is included in the historical archives at the Dolph Briscoe Center for American History; and the Toronto Public Library Archive.

Around 2013, the Warhol film featuring Morse, Tiger Morse (Reel 14 of ****) (1967) was restored and has been shown during screening events. In 2015, the art exhibition "Tiger Morse by Mark Shaw: Jet-Set Style Quest 1962" curated by Alan Rosenberg with the Mark Shaw Photographic Archive, held at the Liz O’Brien Gallery in New York City. In 2017–2018, her work was part of the group exhibition "Mod New York: Fashion Takes a Trip" at the Museum of the City of New York.

== See also ==
- Diana Dew
- Betsey Johnson
- We're Only in It for the Money, studio album by The Mothers of Invention
