= New Yorker Hotel =

Building in Manhattan, New York

The New Yorker Hotel
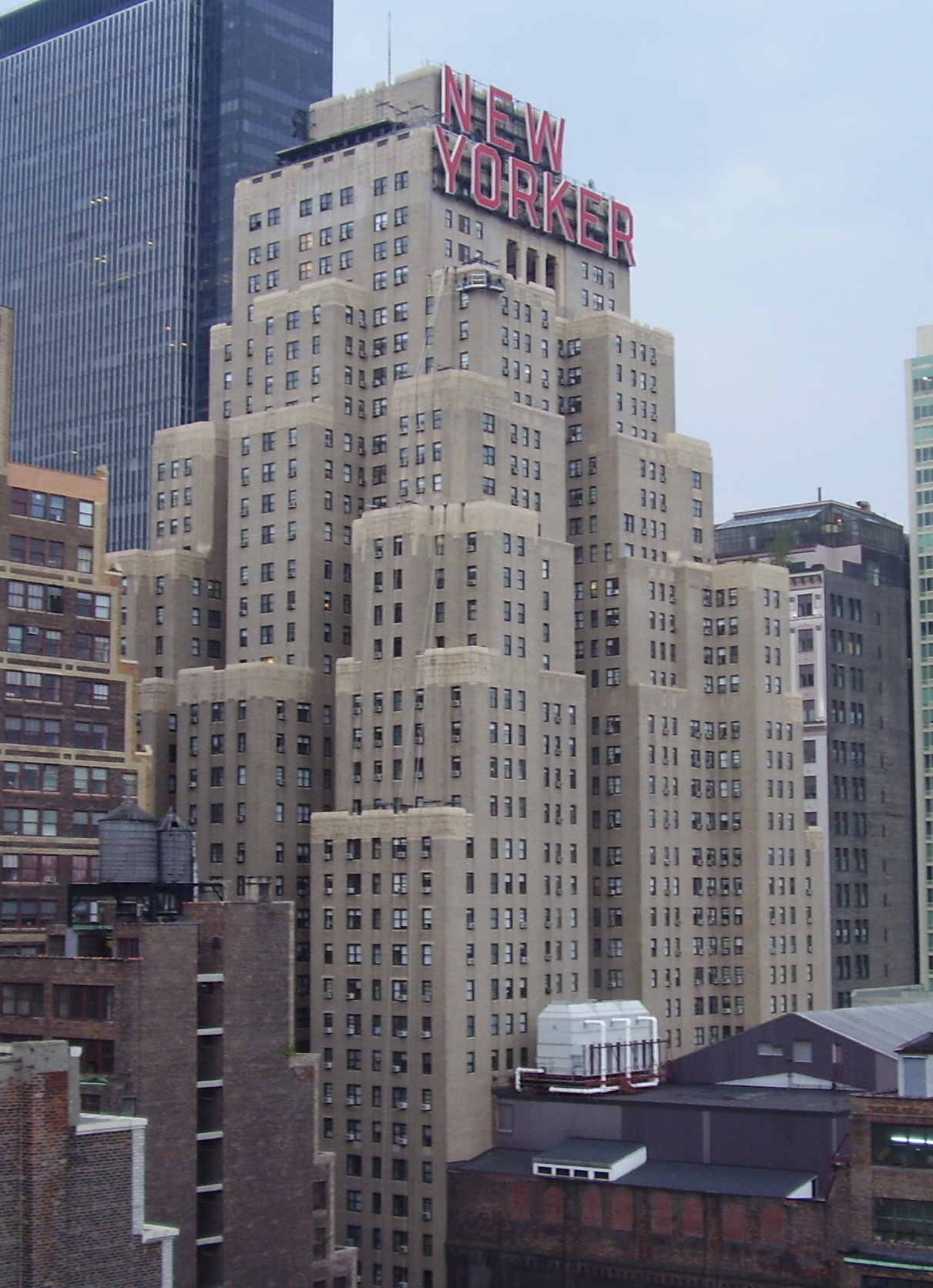
- The hotel, with its large "New Yorker" sign

General information
- Location: 481 Eighth Avenue; Manhattan, New York, U.S.
- Coordinates: 40°45′10″N 73°59′37″W
- Opened: January 2, 1930 (original hotel); June 1, 1994 (current hotel)
- Closed: April 19, 1972 (original hotel)
- Owner: Unification Church of the United States
- Operator: Lotte Hotels

Technical details
- Floor count: 42 (22 for hotel)
- Floor area: 1,000,000 sq ft (93,000 m^{2})

Design and construction
- Architects: Sugarman & Berger
- Developer: Mack Kanner

Other information
- Number of rooms: 1,083 (originally 2,500)
- Number of suites: 64
- Number of restaurants: 3 (originally 5)

Website
- newyorkerhotel.com

The New Yorker Hotel is a mixed-use building at 481 Eighth Avenue in the Hell's Kitchen neighborhood of Manhattan in New York City. Opened in 1930, the building was designed by Sugarman & Berger in the Art Deco style and is 42 stories high, with four basement stories. The building is owned by the Unification Church of the United States, which rents out the lower stories as offices and dormitories. The upper stories comprise the hotel, which has 1,083 guestrooms and has been operated by Lotte Hotels since 2025. The 1-million-square-foot (93,000-square-meter) building also contains three restaurants and approximately 33,000 square feet (3,100 m^{2}) of conference space.

The facade is largely made of brick and terracotta, with Indiana limestone on the lower stories. There are setbacks to comply with the 1916 Zoning Resolution, as well as a large sign with the hotel's name. The building contains a power plant and boiler room in its fourth basement, which was an early example of a cogeneration plant. The public rooms on the lower stories included a Manufacturers Trust bank branch, a double-height lobby, and multiple ballrooms and restaurants. Originally, the hotel had 2,503 guestrooms from the fourth story up.

The New Yorker was built by Mack Kanner and was originally operated by Ralph Hitz, who died in 1940 and was succeeded by Frank L. Andrews. Hilton Hotels bought the building in 1954 and, after conducting extensive renovations, sold it in 1956 to Massaglia Hotels. New York Towers Inc. acquired the building in 1959 but surrendered the property to Hilton in 1967 as part of a foreclosure proceeding. The hotel was closed in 1972 and sold to the French and Polyclinic Medical School and Health Center, which unsuccessfully attempted to develop a hospital there. The Unification Church purchased the building in 1976 and initially used it as a global headquarters. After the top stories of the building reopened as a hotel in 1994, the lower stories were used as offices and dormitories. The hotel rooms have undergone multiple renovations since the hotel reopened. The New Yorker joined the Ramada chain in 2000, then it was transferred to the Wyndham brand in 2014 and to Lotte in 2025.

== Site ==
The New Yorker Hotel is at 481 Eighth Avenue, occupying the western side of the avenue between 34th Street and 35th Street, in the Hell's Kitchen neighborhood of Manhattan in New York City. The land lot is rectangular and covers 34,562 ft^{2} (3,210.9 m^{2}). It has a frontage of 197.5 ft (60.2 m) on Eighth Avenue to the west and 150 ft (46 m) on both 34th Street to the south and 35th Street to the north. Manhattan Center abuts the hotel to the west, while One Penn Plaza, Madison Square Garden, and Pennsylvania Station are to the southeast. Just prior to the New Yorker's development, the site was occupied by 17 buildings, owned by Frederick Brown and the Manufacturers Trust Company. When the New Yorker was built, a bank branch for Manufacturers Trust was constructed at its base.

== Architecture ==
The New Yorker Hotel was designed by Sugarman and Berger and is 42 stories high. The New Yorker Hotel also has four basement levels. Much like the contemporary Empire State Building and the Chrysler Building, the New Yorker was designed in the Art Deco style, which was popular in New York City in the 1920s and 1930s.

=== Form and facade ===
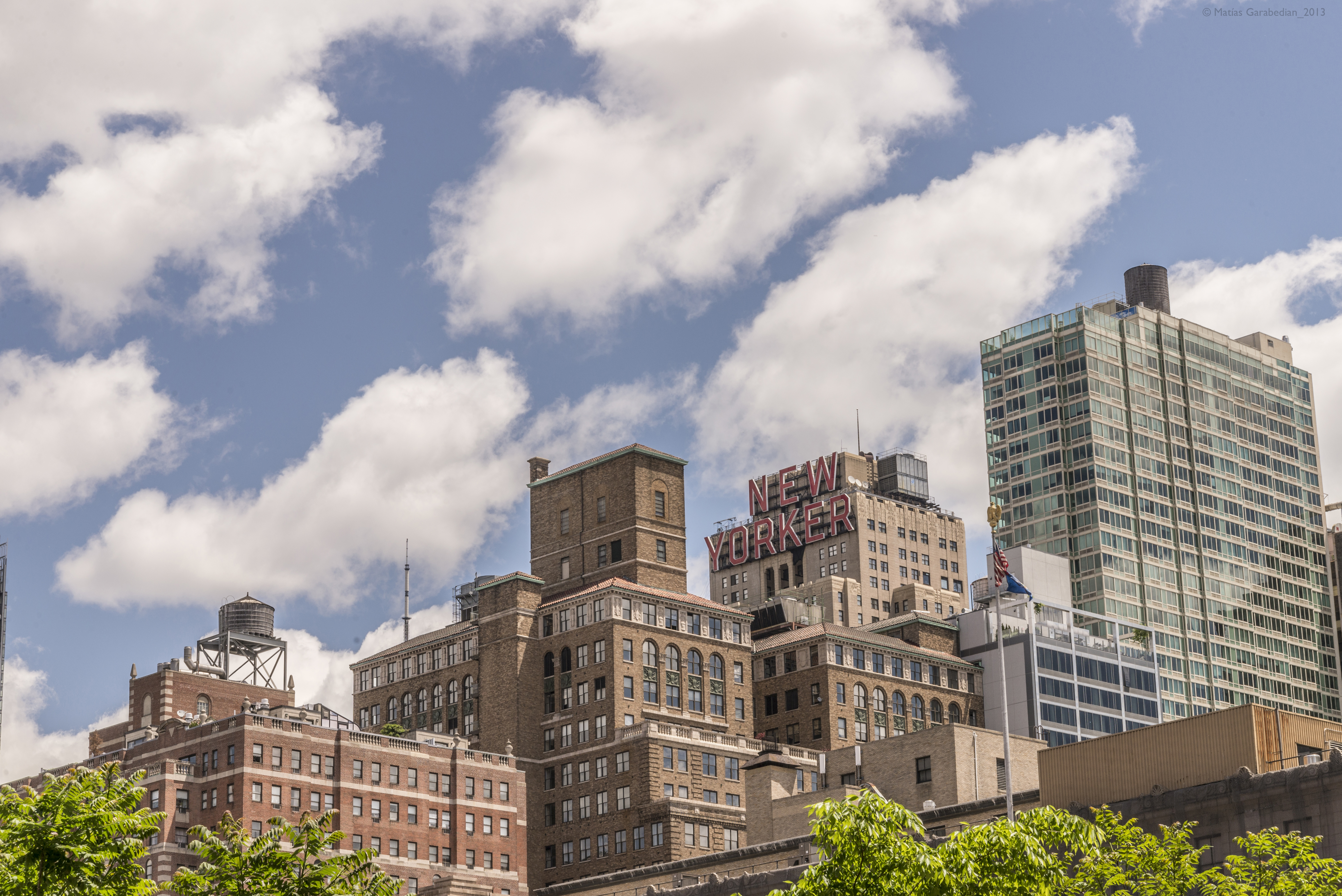
View of the New Yorker from Chelsea, Manhattan

The New Yorker has a relatively plain facade. The first story of the hotel is clad with 12,000 ft^{2} (1,100 m^{2}) of Deer Island granite. The second through fourth stories are clad with Indiana Limestone. The lowest stories are decorated with cast-stone blocks that contain floral designs. There are also some geometric designs on these stories. The hotel also contains marquees above its entrances on Eighth Avenue and 34th Street. Above each marquee is a 36 ft-high (11 m) LED sign that could change color during special occasions.

The fifth through 43rd stories are clad in face brick with some terracotta ornament. The facade mainly consists of vertical bays of windows, separated by vertical gray-brick piers. According to architect Robert A. M. Stern, the alternating bays and piers gave "an impression of boldly modeled masses. This was furthered by the deep-cut light courts, which produced a powerful play of light and shade that was enhanced by dramatic lighting at night". The building contains setbacks to comply with the 1916 Zoning Resolution. The setbacks, characterized by architectural writer Anthony W. Robins as "blocky", are ornamented with stone parapets that contain floral and rhombus patterns.

The western facade contains a sign with the name "New Yorker" in 21 ft-high (6.4 m) capital letters. The original sign was illuminated from 1941 to 1967. The sign was dark until 2005, when it was replaced with an LED sign manufactured by LED Solution of Kitchener, Ontario. The sign can be seen from northern New Jersey, across the Hudson River to the west. Each of the letters can be illuminated separately, allowing the sign to display various messages on special occasions such as celebrations.

=== Mechanical features ===
The hotel contained 23 elevators when it opened. Of these, 12 were passenger elevators, six were service elevators, and two were freight elevators. There was also one elevator from ground level to the subway station; one elevator from ground level to the ballroom; and one elevator within a bank branch in the building.

==== Power plant ====
The hotel contains a power plant and boiler room on its fourth basement, which could support the needs of 35,000 daily guests at the time of the hotel's opening. When the New Yorker opened, it was one of the few large buildings in New York City with its own power plant. The power plant included four uniflow steam engines and one 530 hp (400 kW) diesel engine. One of the steam engines was rated at 640 hp (480 kW), while the others were rated at 960 hp (720 kW). Each of the engines drove a direct current generator. The power plant was operated from a switchboard measuring 60 ft (18 m) long and 7 ft (2.1 m) high. The switchboard contained manual pushbuttons; one button crushed coal that was blown into the furnaces, while another button deposited ashes.

When the hotel opened, the power plant contained more than 200 direct current motors, rated at a combined 3,700 hp (2,800 kW). The plant could generate up to 2,575 kW (3,453 hp), but the hotel only used 850 kW (1,140 hp) on average. It was anticipated that the excess electricity would be sold to nearby buildings, but this did not happen. At the time, this was the largest private power plant in the United States, as well as an early example of a cogeneration plant. The power plant saved the hotel's operators an estimated $48,000 per year. In 2008, the Institute of Electrical and Electronics Engineers designated the New Yorker Hotel's direct current power plant as a Milestone in Electrical Engineering; at the time, the hotel was one of 75 worldwide recipients of that award.

The hotel's own direct current generators were still in use during the Northeast blackout of 1965. The hotel's power system had been modernized to alternating current by 1967. Due to increased energy costs, four cogeneration units were installed in the hotel in 2001, providing 50 percent of the hotel's electricity in the summer and 80 percent in the winter. The cogeneration plant has a total capacity of 600 kW (800 hp). The building also purchases electricity from New York City's power grid, operated by Consolidated Edison. The cogeneration plant reduced the hotel's reliance on the power grid, saving an estimated $400,000 annually by 2009.

==== Other utilities ====
The three largest motors in the original power plant were each capable of 200 hp (150 kW) and supplied three of the hotel's four chillers (the fourth chiller was supplied by a steam engine). The ice plant was capable of making 400,000 blocks of ice per day. The modern-day hotel receives ice from a chiller plant in a neighboring building; the chillers produce ice at night, when energy costs are lower. The chiller plant replaced air conditioners that were installed within the windows of 2,000 rooms.

Steam exhaust from the original power plant was used for functions such as heating. All services that used heat, such as cooking equipment, laundry machines, lights, vacuum cleaners, refrigeration, and air conditioning units were supplied by steam from the power plant. A boiler plant was installed at the New Yorker in 1998, reducing the need to buy steam from the New York City steam system. The boiler plant, which cost $1.5 million to install, saved an average of $3 million annually by 2009. Following a renovation in 2009, the hotel was retrofitted with a four-pipe system of heating, ventilation, and air conditioning (HVAC), allowing guests to set their own temperature settings.

Most of the building's modern-day hot water supply comes from the cogeneration plant. The building contains a storage tank with a capacity of 50,000 U.S. gal (190,000 L; 42,000 imp gal). Water from the tank is transferred into the cogeneration units. There are water tanks on the 25th, 35th, and 44th stories. Sewage is pumped from the basements to the New York City sewage system, and a sump pump supplies soapy warm water to the hotel's restaurants.

=== Interior ===
The New Yorker spans 1×10^{6} sq ft (93,000 m^{2}). The original hotel contained public rooms on its first through fourth stories, as well as guestrooms from the fourth story to the roof. Lajos "Louis" Jambor had painted 26 murals for the hotel's interior, which cost a total of $150,000 (equivalent to $2,800,000 in 2025). The public rooms, originally decorated in the Art Deco style, were redecorated in various styles over the years. Many of Jambor's murals were covered up during the mid-20th century. When the New Yorker reopened as a commercial hotel in 1994, its guestrooms were concentrated on the upper stories, while the lower stories remained in use as offices. The building also contains two restaurants and approximately 33,000 sq ft (3,100 m^{2}) of conference space.

The hotel has four basement levels. The first basement contained the kitchen, which had a dishwashing room; divisions for fish, meat, and poultry; an ice cream room; and a pastry room. On the second basement level were a linen room and valet shop, while on the third basement was the laundry room. The lowest of the hotel's basements contained the power plant.

==== Bank branch ====
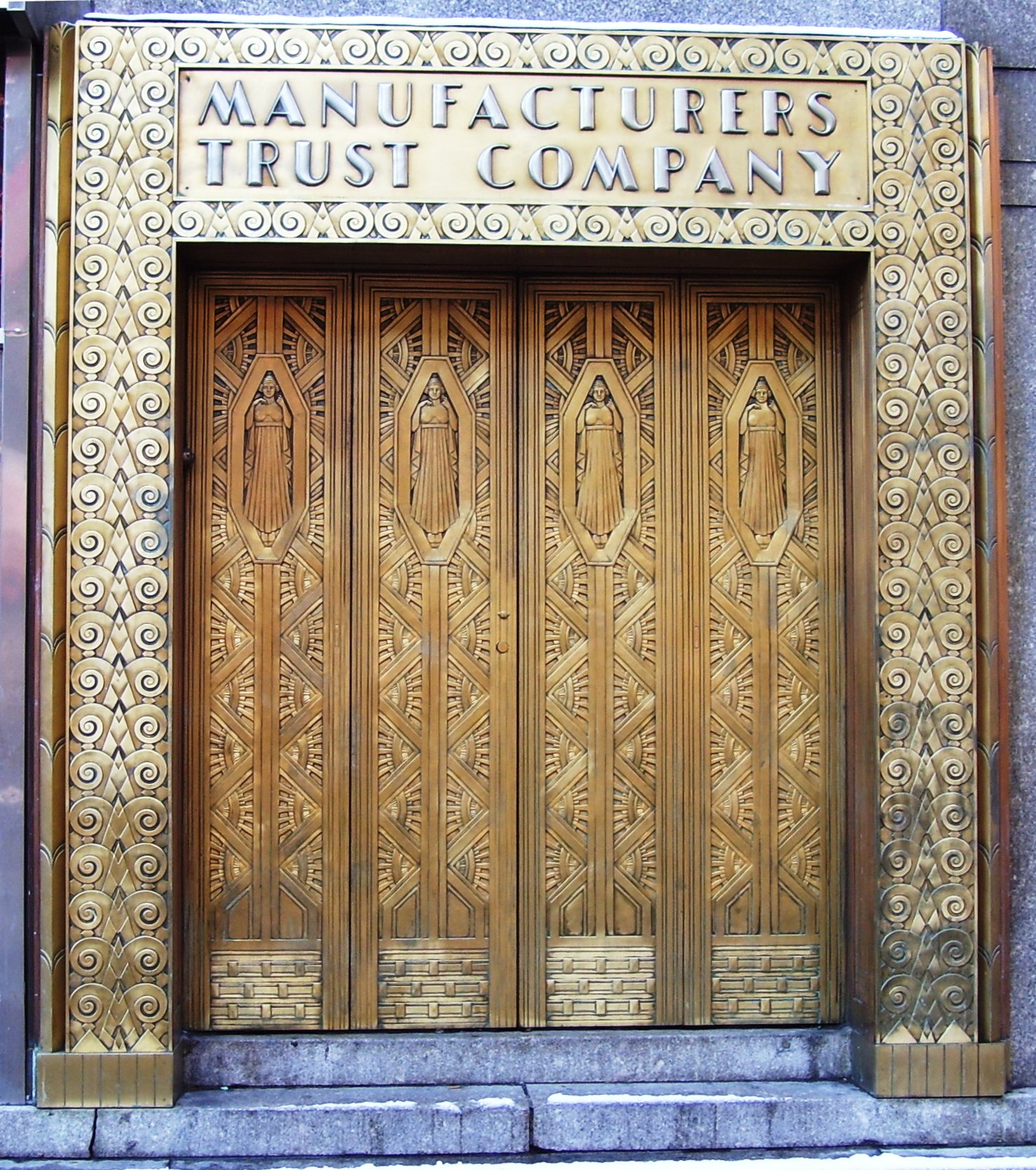
Entrance to the Manufacturers Trust branch

There was a Manufacturers Trust bank branch on the first basement and second floor, designed by Sugarman and Berger. The branch's main entrance was a carved bronze door leading to a lobby, where stairs led up to the second floor and down to the basement. The stairs to the second floor were made of red and black marble and were decorated with a pair of murals by Jambor, which symbolized industry and commerce. The banking room itself had a terrazzo floor and marble walls and columns, as well as large windows on 34th Street. The room contained glass tellers' desks made of bronze and glass, and there was a department for the bank's officers on the eastern wall. The banking room was surrounded by a mezzanine on three sides. The soffit under the mezzanine was made of wood, and there were various pieces of marble furniture. The second floor also contained a women's lounge and service rooms for the bank.

From the ground-floor lobby, a terrazzo stair with an iron railing led to the safe-deposit department in the basement. The entrance to the safe-deposit department was through a wrought-iron grille with the bank's initials. The space itself contained coupon desks and a private conference room, all with wood paneling. The bank branch was closed during the 1980s and was abandoned for several decades. By 2017, the old safe-deposit department had been converted into the Butcher and Banker restaurant. The restaurant retained many of the bank's original design features, such as the vault door and safe-deposit drawers.

==== Public rooms ====
The first basement contained a tunnel linking to the original Pennsylvania Station as well as to 34th Street–Penn Station on the New York City Subway's Eighth Avenue Line (A, C, and E trains). Through Penn Station, this tunnel also connected to 34th Street–Penn Station on the New York City Subway's Broadway–Seventh Avenue Line (1, 2, and 3 trains). This tunnel opened in February 1930 (Note: The Eighth Avenue Line station was not yet in operation at the time; it opened in September 1932.) but was closed by the 1960s; it was being used as a storage area by the 2000s. The Coffee House cafe and the 250-seat Mosaic Room ballroom were constructed in the basement in 1955. The cafe and ballroom were connected to the lobby via a pair of escalators. After the hotel reopened, the basement had a self-service laundry and fitness center. In the early 2010s, the basement laundry room was converted to meeting spaces, each covering 2,500 ft^{2} (230 m^{2}).

The main entrance on Eighth Avenue leads to a double-story lobby. It originally had green-marble paneling; some of Jambor's murals, depicting scenes from New York City's history, were placed on the lobby's north and south walls and on the ceiling. The lobby was redesigned in 1953 with glass screens and wooden paneling, as well as classical details like Corinthian columns and chandeliers. During a 2009 renovation, designers restored the marble floor, installed a chandelier suspended from the coffered ceiling, and added new check-in and concierge desks. In addition, storefronts within the lobby were removed to make way for entrances to the Tick Tock Diner and Cooper's Tavern restaurants.

A mezzanine overlooked the lobby. On the mezzanine level was a double-height main ballroom with walnut paneling and more murals by Jambor on each wall. The main ballroom also contained a projection room at its rear. Also at mezzanine level was a terrace ballroom with space for 300 people; it had tapestries on its walls. When the hotel reopened in the 1990s, the two ballrooms on the mezzanine (now the second floor) were restored, and seven meeting rooms were constructed on the third floor. In the mid-2000s, an exhibit with 500 artifacts from the hotel's history was installed on the mezzanine. Joseph Kinney, the hotel's chief engineer and unofficial archivist, collected the artifacts.

There were ten private dining "salons" and five restaurants employing 35 master cooks. The dining salons could fit between 15 and 200 people each. The restaurants included the main restaurant; a "terrace restaurant", featuring live events and entertainment; a men's grill room called the Manhattan Room; a tea room; and a cafe. The terrace restaurant abutted an outdoor "summer terrace" with a retractable ice rink. The terrace restaurant hosted both ice shows and Big Bands. The ice shows were discontinued in 1946 because of the expense of replacing the ice rink and because of the American Guild of Variety Artists' support for removing the ice shows, although they resumed in 1948 due to high demand. The Terrace Room's shows were discontinued permanently in 1950 after the federal government imposed a 20 percent excise tax on such shows. By 1999, the Terrace Room operated as a television studio for TV channel MSG. The fourth story was supposed to contain an in-house medical department with four operating rooms, as well as a beauty parlor and a women's parlor.

==== Guest rooms ====
Originally, the hotel had 2,503 guestrooms. The fourth story contained some public rooms and some guestrooms. The hotel was almost entirely composed of guestrooms from the fifth story up. At the time of the hotel's opening, each guestroom had a radio set that could be tuned to one of four channels; according to the hotel's managers, this made the New Yorker the first large hotel in the world with "a central system of radio with a radio receiving set in every room". Approximately 50 suites on the upper stories had private terraces. During the mid-20th century, the guestrooms on the fifth through eighth stories typically hosted trade-show exhibits throughout the year.

When the hotel reopened in 1994, it had 250 guestrooms, which by 1999 had been expanded to 1,005 guestrooms. These included 35 mini-suites, which overlooked the Hudson River and Lower Manhattan, as well as four deluxe suites, which had balconies. Following a renovation in the late 2000s, the hotel had 912 rooms, arranged in 17 layouts. During that renovation, the guestrooms were largely redesigned in the Art Deco style, with geometric carpets, star-shaped ceiling lights, and curtains. There are two rooms with terraces directly under the hotel's large "New Yorker" sign. In addition, Educational Housing Services operates 169 rooms on the 24th to 27th stories as part of a student dormitory.

== History ==
The New Yorker Hotel was built by Mack Kanner, who had helped create the Garment District of Manhattan during the mid-1920s. Kanner had previously hired Sugarman and Berger to design the Navarre Building within the Garment District. Kanner wished to build a hotel on 34th Street, which he believed was "destined to be the most important crosstown thoroughfare in the city".

=== Construction ===
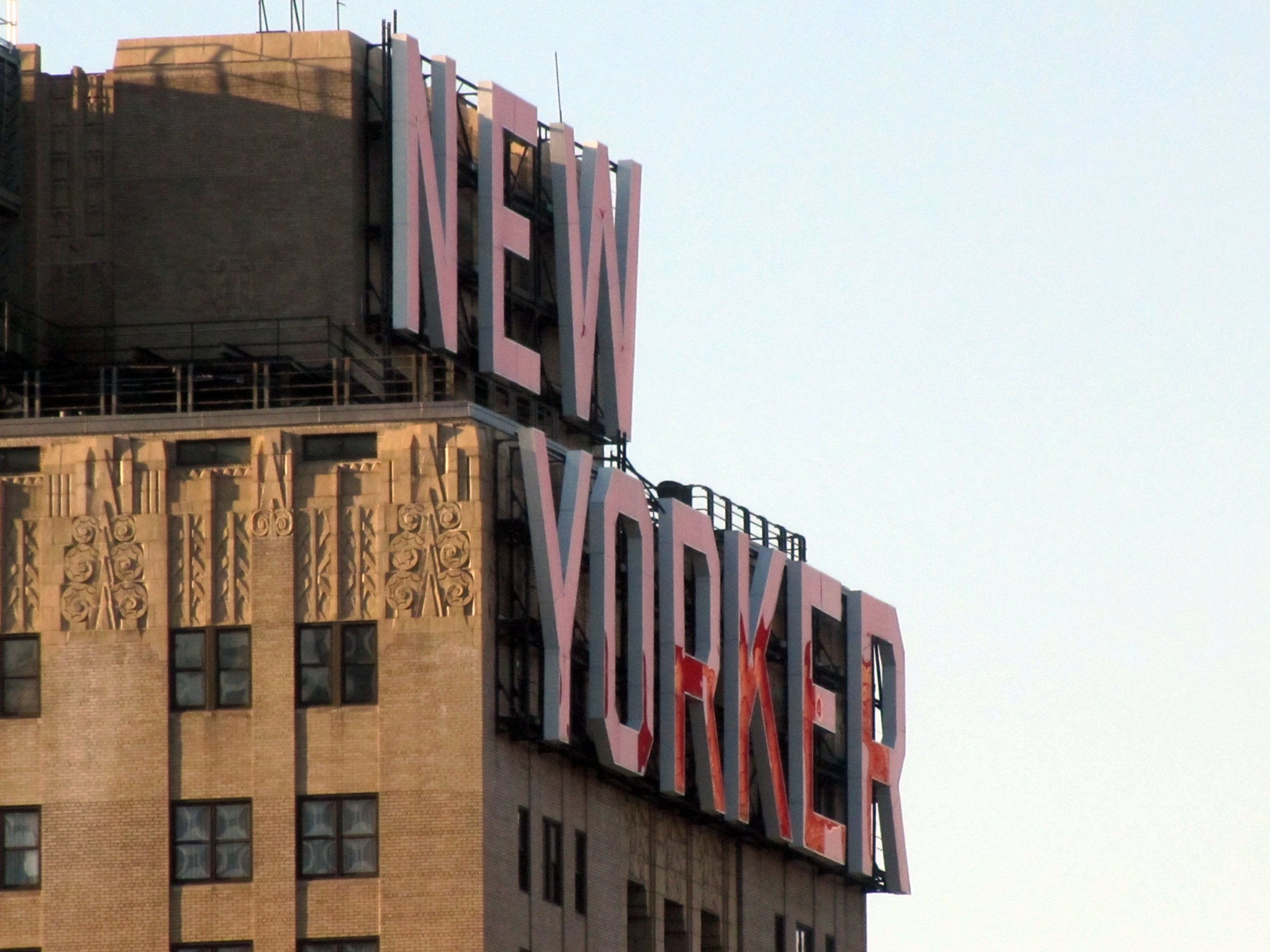
Side view of the New Yorker's sign

Kanner and Jacob S. Becker announced plans for a hotel at Eighth Avenue and 34th Street in February 1928, while they were developing the Navarre Building. The hotel was to have 38 stories rising 400 ft (120 m), as well as five basements descending 75 ft (23 m). With 2,503 rooms, it would be larger than the nearby Hotel Pennsylvania, which at the time had the most rooms of any hotel in the city. The New Yorker would also be the second-tallest hotel in New York City, behind the Ritz Tower. The building was planned to cost $8 million. Workers began excavating the site the same month. The George J. Atwill Company, the excavation contractor, employed 350 workers in three shifts. Plans for the hotel were filed in March 1928, when Sugarman and Berger submitted blueprints to the New York City Department of Buildings.

The American Bridge Company was hired in June 1928 to manufacture the hotel's steel frame, which was to include 12,000 short tons (11,000 long tons; 11,000 t) of steel. The site had been cleared by August 1928, after 2.5×10^{6} ft^{3} (71,000 m^{3}) of rock had been removed from the site. The excavation cost $1 million and, according to the New York Herald Tribune, was "perhaps the deepest cut ever excavated in Manhattan". That September, the hotel received a $9.5 million mortgage loan from the Manufacturers Trust Company. At a ceremony on October 25, 1928, Kanner drove a golden rivet into the hotel's steel frame, where the superstructure had begun to rise above the foundation. By this point, the hotel was planned to contain 45 stories above ground. Seven hundred masonry workers and helpers began constructing the facade in January 1929. The hotel's construction was delayed for two weeks that February, when all masonry workers went on strike. The strike took place amid allegations that masonry contractor John J. Meehan had directed workers to install brickwork of substandard quality.

Kanner drove the last rivet into the hotel's steel frame in April 1929. Ralph Hitz was hired as the hotel's first manager that July. Hitz hired about fifty of his colleagues from Cincinnati, and he led a $500,000 advertising campaign for the hotel, which at the time was far removed from many of Midtown Manhattan's major attractions. Hitz also hired Bernie Cummins's orchestra to play at the hotel. The hotel's facade had been completed in September 1929. The hotel required massive amounts of materials, including 51,000 bedsheets, 85 miles of carpets, 45 tons of glass, and six carloads of china. The New Yorker ultimately cost $22.5 million and contained 2,500 rooms, making it the city's largest hotel. In addition, it was the world's second-largest hotel behind the Stevens Hotel in Chicago. The New Yorker was one of 37 hotels to be built in Manhattan during 1929, and it was one of two hotels near Penn Station with more than 1,000 rooms to be completed that year, the other being Hotel Governor Clinton.

=== Opening and early years ===
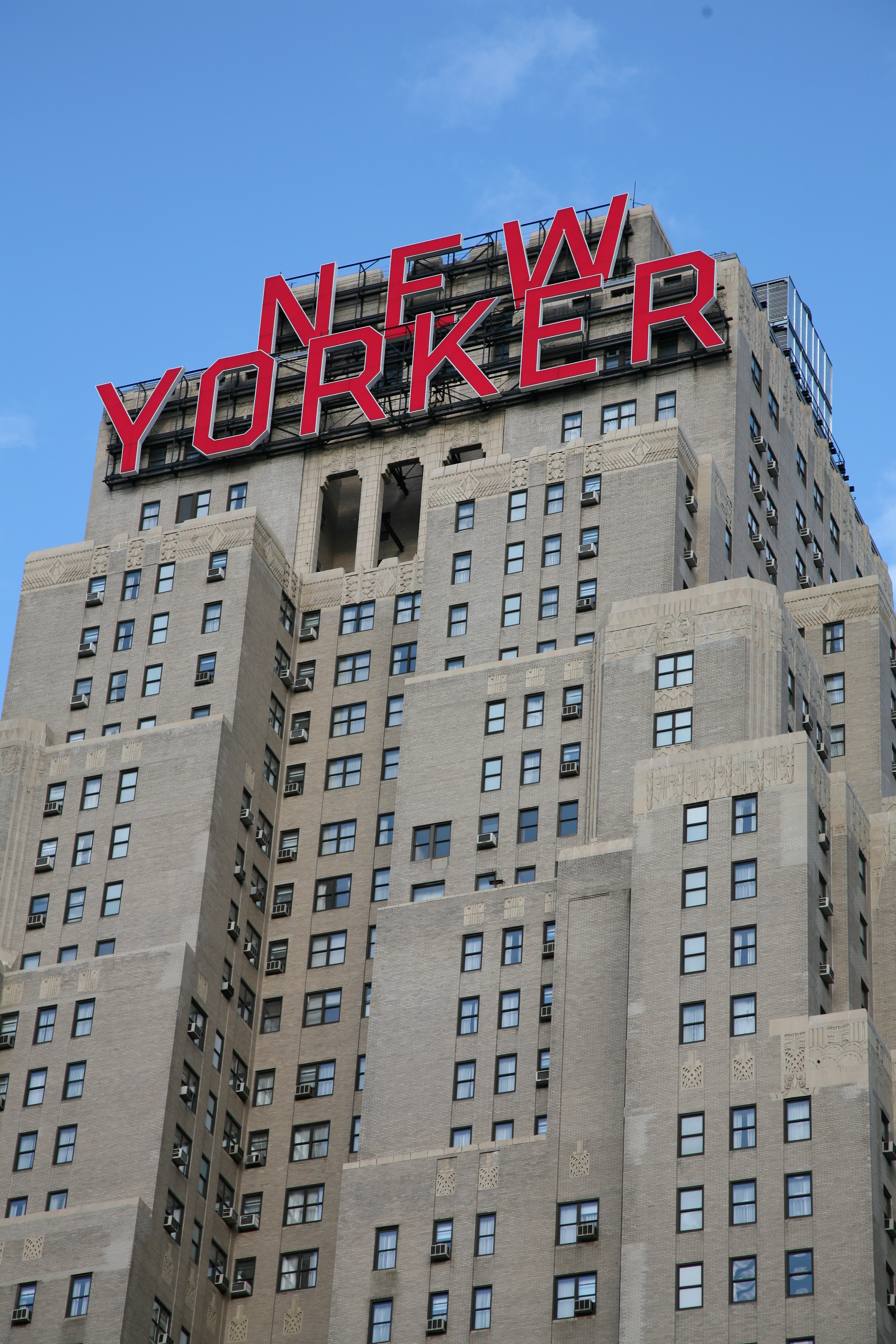
Close-up of the tower

A pre-opening ceremony for the New Yorker was hosted on December 28, 1929, and the Manufacturers Trust bank branch at the hotel's base opened the next day. The hotel officially opened on January 2, 1930. Eight hundred guests made reservations on the first day, many of whom took home souvenirs, prompting Hitz to predict that "the total loss will exceed everything in the past history of hotel openings". Upon the hotel's completion, it employed 17 manicurists, 43 barbers, and numerous multilingual waiters. Nightly room rates ranged from $3.30 for a single-bedroom unit to $30 for a suite with a terrace. The New Yorker also employed 92 "telephone girls", as well as 95 switchboard operators and 150 laundry staff, who washed 450,000 pieces of linen per day.

==== Hitz operation ====
The hotel had been completed at the beginning of the Great Depression, so it was initially largely empty. The New York Observer said that, according to one urban legend, the hotel's management attracted business by turning on all the lights, announcing that the hotel was fully booked, and directing would-be guests to the Pennsylvania. In its first year of operation, the New Yorker recorded a profit of $1.293 million. Hitz added 12 suites of "sample rooms" in early 1931, where products and furnishings were exhibited. Hitz then decided to create the National Hotel Management Company, a national hotel chain managed by the New Yorker Hotel's staff. He acquired the Book Cadillac Hotel in Detroit as the first hotel in the chain in January 1932.

Hitz renewed his original five-year lease for 30 more years in 1933, and Frank L. Andrews was hired the next year as the hotel's general manager. When Andrews was promoted to a vice president of the National Hotel Management Company in 1936, George V. Riley became the hotel's resident manager, overseeing day-to-day operations. The Equitable Life Assurance Society gave the New Yorker Hotel a loan of $6.5 million in 1938, and Leo A. Molony of the Hotel Pennsylvania was hired as the New Yorker's resident manager the same year. Hitz continued to acquire hotels for his chain, which contained seven hotels when it was disbanded upon his death in January 1940.

==== Andrews operation ====
After Hitz died, Andrews became the New Yorker Corporation's president. The hotel had received three million total guests by 1941. The same year, the hotel's managers installed custom-made ultraviolet devices in the hotel's bathrooms, which it advertised under the name "Protecto-Ray". Throughout the 1940s and 1950s, the New York Observer said that "actors, celebrities, athletes, politicians, mobsters, the shady and the luminous—the entire Brooklyn Dodgers roster during the glory seasons—would stalk the bars and ballrooms, or romp upstairs".

In spite of its popularity, the New Yorker consistently lost money from the 1930s to the early 1950s. The Manufacturers Trust Company's president disclosed in early 1946 that it had taken over control of the hotel. The New Yorker's managers announced the same year that they would install television sets in some of the public rooms. The hotel's managers also installed TVs in 100 guestrooms in 1948, making it the second hotel in the city with guestroom TVs, after the Roosevelt. That year, the hotel spent $50,000 (equivalent to $670,000 in 2025) to combine eight double rooms into one luxury suite. Gene Voit was named as the New Yorker's general manager in 1951. Andrews announced in early 1953 that he planned to spend $600,000 on renovating the hotel, hiring Eleanor Le Maire to redesign the lobby.

=== Mid-20th century ===
==== Hilton purchase and renovations ====
Hilton Hotels agreed in November 1953 to acquire the New Yorker for $12.5 million, prompting Andrews to announce that he would retire from the New Yorker Hotel Corporation. Hilton Hotels took title to the hotel the following month and immediately started renovating the hotel, completing the first phase of the project in March 1954. A meditation chapel opened within the New Yorker that May. The chain allocated another $1.5 million to further renovations in June 1954, and it hired the Walter M. Ballard Corporation to convert the hotel's former Empire Tea Room into a restaurant for $175,000. Hilton Hotels refurbished the hotel's cafe and installed an escalator from the lobby to the cafe, the first escalator in a hotel in New York City. The chain planned to repaint all of the rooms, as well as renovate hallways and guestrooms on four stories so they could be used for trade exhibits. In addition, the chain planned to replace twin beds in 100 guest rooms, redecorate 45 luxury suites, and install air-conditioning in several public rooms.

Meanwhile, Hilton Hotels had purchased the Statler Hotels chain in 1954. At the time, it owned large hotels in many major cities, including the New Yorker, the Roosevelt, the Pennsylvania, the Plaza, and the Waldorf-Astoria in New York City. Consequently, the federal government filed an antitrust action against Hilton in April 1955. The New Yorker was making a profit by the end of 1955, At that point, Conrad Hilton was negotiating to sell the hotel, amid rumors that the chain was planning to sell multiple hotels to resolve the federal lawsuit. To resolve the suit, Hilton Hotels agreed to sell three hotels in February 1956, including either the Roosevelt or the New Yorker.

==== Subsequent ownership ====
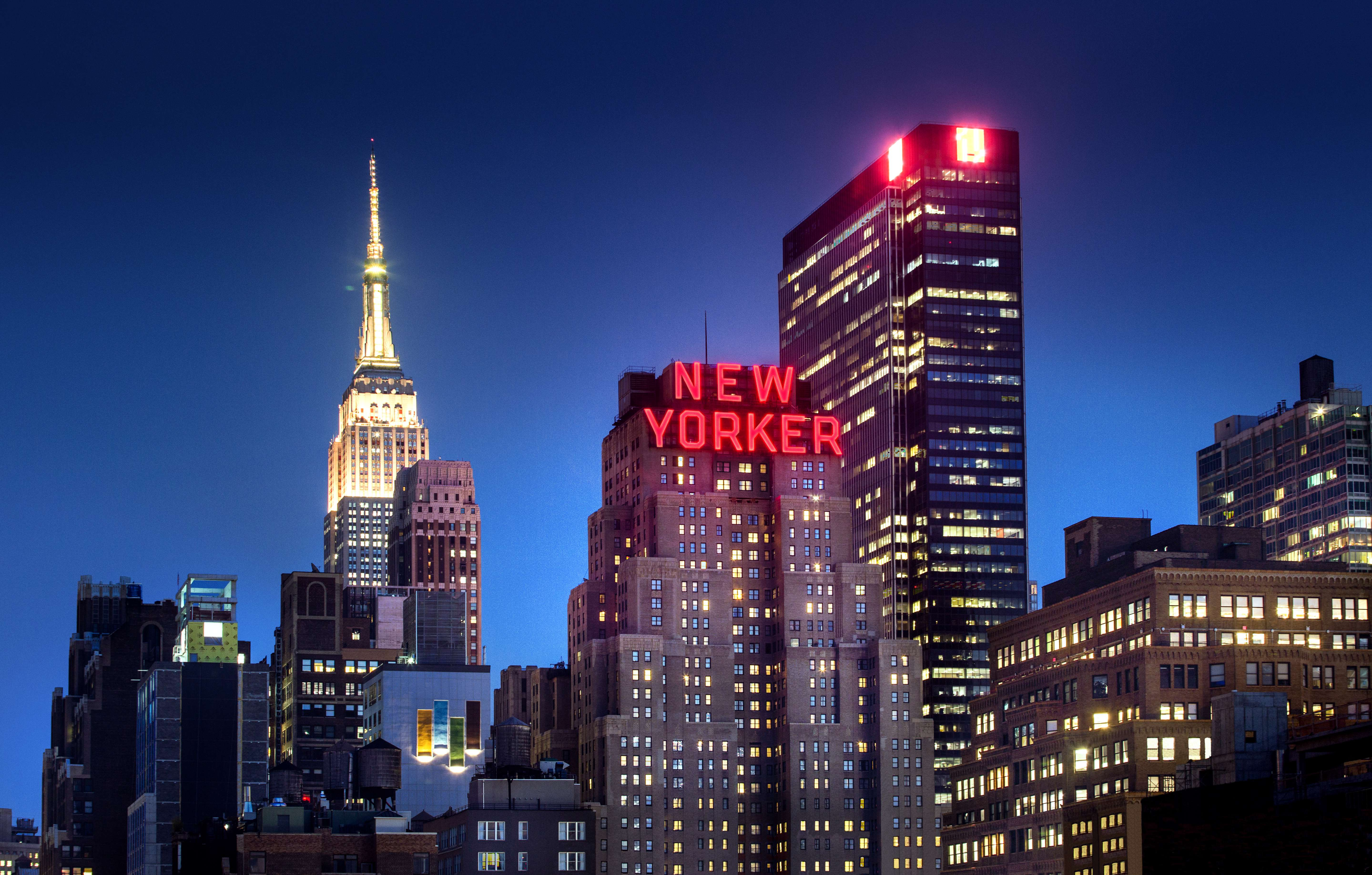
The hotel building seen at night

Hilton sold the New Yorker in May 1956 to Massaglia Hotels for $20 million, despite the fact that the chain had already sold the Roosevelt. As partial payment for the New Yorker, Joseph Massaglia Jr. of Massaglia Hotels sold the Senator Hotel in Sacramento, California, to Hilton. Massaglia took over the hotel at the beginning of September 1956, paying an estimated $20 million. Charles W. Cole of Massaglia Hotels began managing the hotel, and Douglas Shaffer was appointed as the hotel's resident manager in July 1957. Massaglia then negotiated for a year and a half to sell the hotel to New York Towers Ltd., an investment syndicate led by Alexander Gross.

New York Towers ultimately bought the hotel in September 1959 with plans to spend $2 million on renovations. New York Towers renovated the main ballroom, lobby, and guestrooms, and it added air conditioning throughout the hotel. The New Yorker's managers announced these changes at a reception in September 1960. The hotel experienced a large fire that November, which killed one person and damaged the sixth floor. The New York City Fire Department ordered seven stories to be closed after the fire, although these stories reopened within two days, after the hotel's owners had conducted emergency repairs. In anticipation of the opening of the nearby Madison Square Garden arena, New York Towers renovated the New Yorker's two main ballrooms, as well as several smaller public rooms. The hotel's operators predicted that the arena's opening would attract additional conventions to the hotel.

Gross's firm had fallen behind on mortgage payments by 1966, and the hotel went into receivership that April. According to The Wall Street Journal, "other real estate industry sources" indicated that the hotel had lost $4 million since New York Towers bought it. The next month, the New Yorker's owners filed for Chapter 11 bankruptcy, claiming $21.5 million in debt, half of which came from seven mortgages. At an auction in December 1967, Hilton repurchased the New Yorker Hotel for $5.6 million. Hilton's public relations director said the chain had reacquired the hotel because the surrounding neighborhood was "coming back to life" with the development of Madison Square Garden and nearby office buildings. Hilton began refurbishing the hotel yet again in June 1968, spending $5 million on the main ballroom and lobby. By the late 1960s and early 1970s, the hotel largely catered to guests in the garment industry, as well as businessmen who were attending trade shows there. The New Yorker had downsized to 2,000 rooms, but it was still one of New York City's largest hotels.

=== Closure and redevelopment attempts ===
==== Hospital plan ====
By December 1971, Hilton Hotels planned to sell the New Yorker for $13.5 million to the French and Polyclinic Medical School and Health Center, which planned to convert the building into a 749-room hospital. According to French and Polyclinic vice president Xavier Lividini, Hilton officials did not believe the area could support "too many hotels". The medical center ultimately agreed to buy the hotel for $8.8 million; it made a down payment of $1.8 million and received a $7.1 million mortgage loan. In addition, it leased the underlying land from Hilton for 99 years, acquiring an option to purchase the land in the future Hilton closed the hotel on April 19, 1972. French and Polyclinic had wanted to begin converting the New Yorker immediately, with plans to open the hospital in 1974. At the time of the New Yorker's closure, the number of hotel rooms in New York City was declining, and the city had lost 3,800 rooms in 1972 alone, over half of which had been in the New Yorker.

French and Polyclinic added some living spaces and administrative offices for nurses and staff, as well as space for its postgraduate medical school. Before the medical center could fully convert the hotel into a hospital, the New York State Department of Health (NYSDOH) had to approve the plans, and the New York State Housing Finance Agency (HFA) had to agree to a mortgage commitment for the project. NYSDOH did not approve the plans until eight months after the hotel closed. Afterward, the HFA twice rejected French and Polyclinic's application for a mortgage commitment, saying that the medical center did not have enough capital for the conversion. French and Polyclinic also spent around $210,000 per month on the hospital building, including $80,000 on a first mortgage, $75,000 on maintenance fees, and $60,000 in taxes. The medical center received a tax abatement for the hotel building in June 1973. French and Polyclinic filed for Chapter 11 bankruptcy that July, allowing the medical center to defer payment of other debts and allocate funding for the New Yorker project. State assemblyman Andrew Stein said the medical center's bankruptcy was a direct result of its acquisition of the New Yorker.

The medical center's president, Stanley Salmen, resigned in late 1973 after controversies over the bankruptcy filing and the New Yorker's delayed renovation. To reduce its increasing losses, in September 1974, the medical center proposed converting the New Yorker into a homeless shelter for 500 families who had been displaced by emergencies. Manhattan Community Board 4, which represented the neighborhood, indicated that October that it needed additional time to consider plans for the shelter. French and Polyclinic unsuccessfully attempted to obtain private funding for the hospital from Merrill Lynch, Pierce, Fenner & Smith, and the city government rejected the shelter plan that November. The medical center continued to use the hotel as an office and dormitory but only occupied one-tenth of the building. French and Polyclinic officially abandoned its plans for the hospital at the end of November 1974. The cancellation of the hospital eventually forced French and Polyclinic to close completely in 1977.

==== Further redevelopment attempts ====
After French and Polyclinic abandoned its plans for the hospital, Hilton Hotels agreed to take back the hotel, which it did in February 1975. Hilton had no plans to reopen the hotel at the time. The chain tried to sell the hotel but struggled to find a buyer. The New Yorker was one of three shuttered hostelries on Eighth Avenue in Midtown that were having trouble attracting buyers; the others were the Royal Manhattan Hotel and the 51st Street YWCA. By mid-1975, Hilton Hotels maintained a loss reserve of $5.5 million on the hotel. The New York Daily News reported in June 1975 that the New Yorker owed the second-most real-estate taxes of any building in New York City, with $1.8 million in back taxes.

A syndicate led by Irving Schatz had acquired a purchase option for the hotel by early 1976; at the time, the New Yorker's only occupant was a ground-level bank branch. Schatz planned to convert the building into 1,000 apartments. Hilton and Equitable Life allowed Schatz to extend his option, but he could not obtain financing from major savings banks because of the low occupancy rate of a nearby residential development, Manhattan Plaza.

=== Unification Church acquisition ===
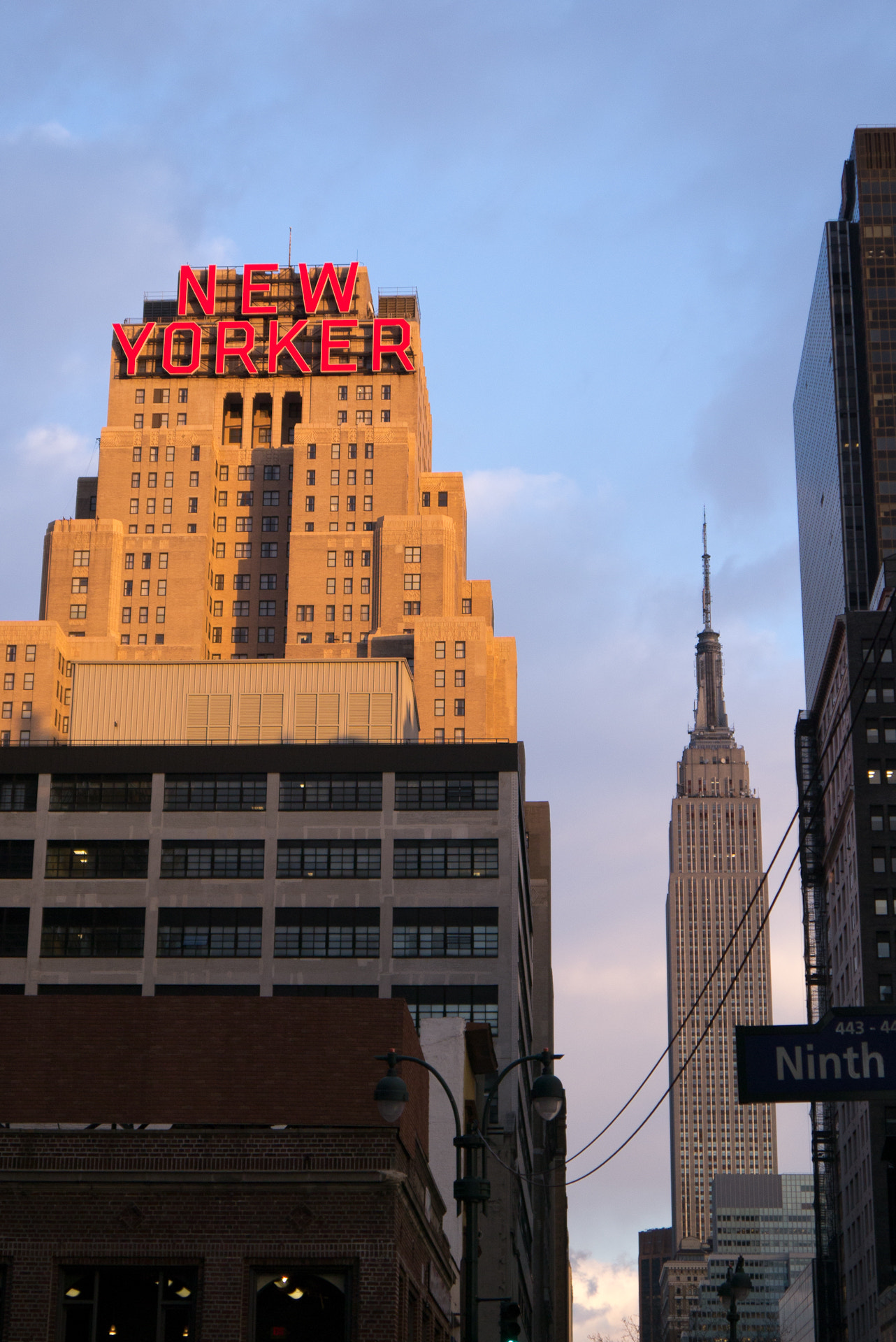
The New Yorker Hotel as seen from Ninth Avenue; the Empire State Building is at right

The Unification Church, led by Sun Myung Moon, agreed to buy the hotel in May 1976. The church paid $5.6 million, a discount of more than $3 million from the price that French and Polyclinic had paid several years earlier. As part of the sale, Hilton Hotels agreed to pay $1.1 million in back taxes to the city. The church also acquired the neighboring Manhattan Center, which it had similarly bought at a deep discount. After acquiring the New Yorker Hotel, the Unification Church converted the hotel for use by its members, and it became the World Mission Center, the church's global headquarters. The Unification Church had about 1,500 full-time volunteers in the New York City area at the time; these volunteers would renovate the hotel themselves and use it as a dormitory. U.S. representative Bella Abzug criticized the fact that Moon planned to hire his adherents, rather than unionized laborers, for the renovations. By August 1976, there were 150 volunteers living on the hotel's 20th through 30th floors. According to the Unification Church, its volunteers had been placed in "the best rooms, where the best plumbing is".

The church requested in 1977 that the New York City Board of Estimate grant a tax exemption to the New Yorker, which had been valued at $11 million the prior year. The church stopped paying taxes in 1978, while its application for a tax exemption was pending. During the same time, the Board of Estimate had refused to give the Unification Church a tax exemption for three other properties, on the basis that it was not a true church. The New York Supreme Court affirmed the city's refusal to give a tax exemption for these buildings, but the New York Court of Appeals overturned the Supreme Court's decision in May 1982, ruling that the three properties did qualify for a tax exemption. Although the Appeals Court ruling did not specifically name the New Yorker Hotel, church officials insisted that the hotel was also tax-exempt. City officials disagreed and, in August 1982, initiated foreclosure proceedings on the hotel, which had $4.5 million in unpaid back taxes. At the time, church officials used the hotel as a dormitory and conducted services there. Ultimately, the New Yorker received an 83 percent property-tax exemption.

The New Yorker did not operate as a commercial hotel, as all of the guestrooms were reserved for church members. The hotel largely housed unmarried adherents of the Unification Church, but their numbers had dwindled after the church conducted a mass-marriage ceremony at Madison Square Garden in 1982. Consequently, the New Yorker was closed during the winter of 1982–1983 because the Unification Church could not pay its fuel costs. The church began renovating the hotel in 1987, evicting 1,200 members who lived there; Newsday reported that the church had not decided what it would do with the hotel. During the next decade, an increasing proportion of residents got married and moved away, and quality of life in the neighborhood improved. In addition, there was increasing demand for hotel rooms in New York City.

=== Reopening ===
==== 1990s and early 2000s ====
In May 1994, the Unification Church decided to convert the New Yorker's top eight stories to 250 guestrooms, marketing them to business travelers visiting Javits Center, Penn Station, and Madison Square Garden. The church also redeveloped the ground-floor banking space, although the remaining stories continued to operate as offices and dormitories. The hotel was reopened in stages, and the first 178 rooms opened on June 1, 1994, operated by the New Yorker Hotel Management Company. The New Yorker contained 240 rooms by 1995. Barry Mann became the hotel's general manager. The hotel's clientele largely consisted of tourists from Asia, Europe, and South America, and between 60 and 80 percent of bookings came from wholesalers and travel brokers.

The hotel began a $30 million renovation in 1997. Within two years, the hotel had expanded to 860 rooms; the lowest stories included amenity areas, while the 7th through 17th floors were rented out as commercial office space. Also in 1999, nearly 400 workers in non-managerial positions joined a labor union after several workers complained about low wages and the presence of asbestos in the hotel. The New Yorker failed to attract business travelers as originally anticipated, so it joined the Ramada hotel chain in January 2000. Hotel management believed that the Ramada franchise agreement would raise revenues by up to 200 percent. The hotel was henceforth renamed the Ramada New Yorker. To further attract businesspeople, hotel management offered a promotion in which room prices were linked to the Dow Jones Industrial Average.

Tourism in New York City had stagnated by early 2001, but business was even more negatively impacted by the September 11 attacks, which caused the hotel's profit margin to decrease from 25 to 5 percent. At the time of the attacks, the hotel had 1,100 rooms. The hotel's operators decided to convert the 17th floor back into offices, since the destruction of the World Trade Center had caused a shortage of office space in Manhattan; by early 2002, fifteen former tenants of the World Trade Center had relocated to the hotel. The Barbizon School of Modeling leased 9,000 ft^{2} (840 m^{2}) in 2002. Ten psychotherapists also rented offices on the 17th floor, and Educational Housing Services rented space for dormitories on the 24th through 27th floors in 2003. Kevin Smith, the president of the New Yorker Hotel Management Company, considered converting the guestrooms to condominiums but ultimately rejected the plan.

==== 2000s renovations ====
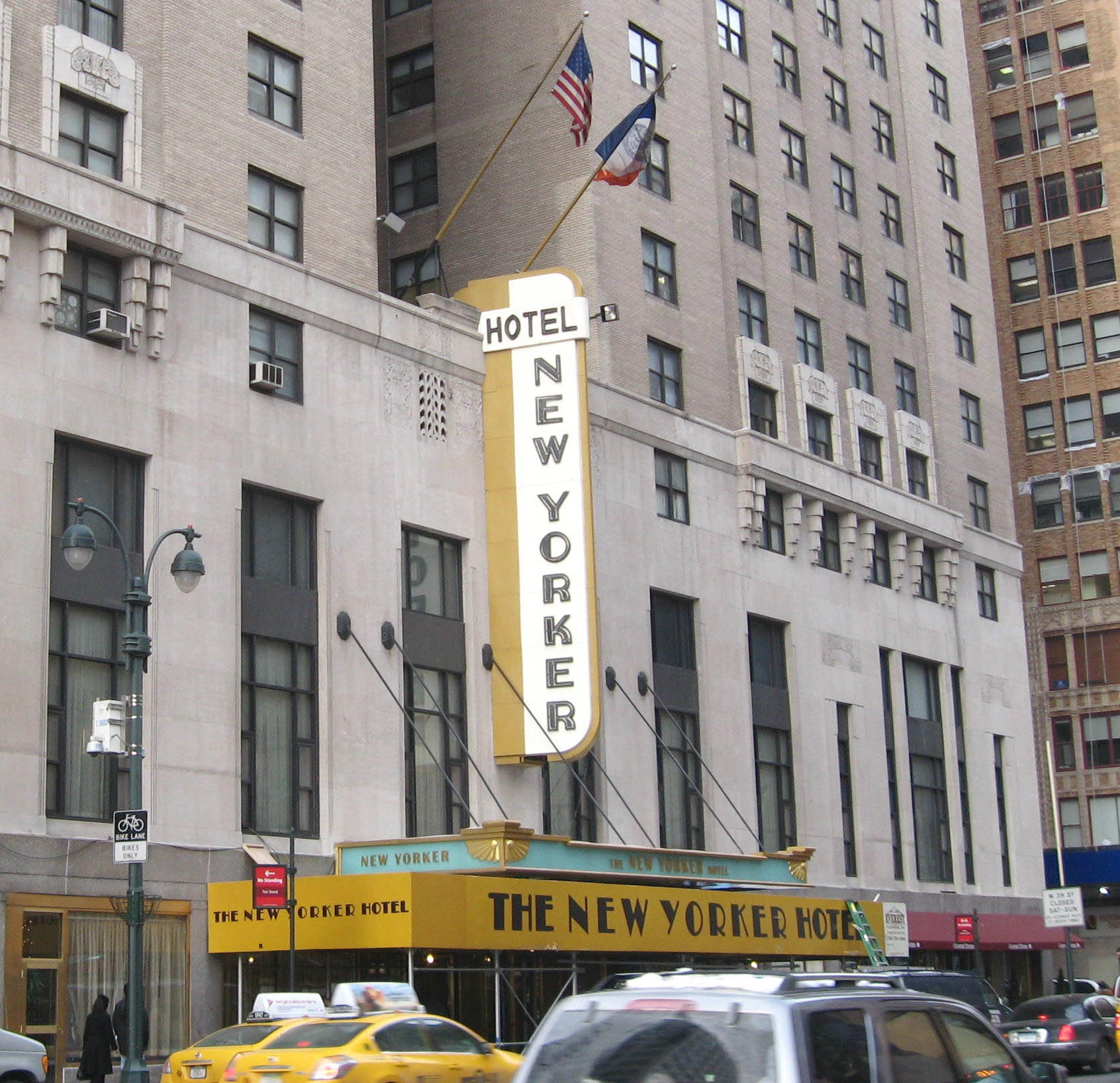
8th Avenue entrance

Smith announced plans in 2004 to renovate the hotel in advance of a proposed expansion of the Javits Center and the redevelopment of the James A. Farley Building. Decreased cash flows after the September 11 attacks had prompted the managers to defer renovations, but tourism in New York City had begun to recover by then, and guests were being attracted to newer hotels. The project would cost $43 million and would include renovating the lobby and meeting rooms, adding a central HVAC system, and refurbishing the upper-story guestrooms. The lower stories would retain 250,000 ft^{2} (23,000 m^{2}) of office space and 100,000 ft^{2} (9,300 m^{2}) of dormitories, and the Tick Tock Diner and the La Vigna restaurant at ground level would be refurbished.

The first stage of the renovation took place in 2005, when the hotel's management replaced the large sign on the facade, which had not been lit since 1967. A new LED sign was installed in advance of the hotel's 75th anniversary and was illuminated in December 2005. Smith announced in August 2007 that he would complete a further renovation of the hotel for $65 million. At the time, the hotel had 840 rooms. The renovation was designed by Stonehill & Taylor Architects. The project involved replacing guestroom furnishings; redesigning the lobby, entrance, and foyer; renovating the restaurant; replacing the individual air-conditioning in each room with a central HVAC system; and upgrading Wi-Fi and televisions. As part of the project, the marble floors in the lobby were restored, and a new sprinkler system was added. In addition, the Cooper's Tavern restaurant opened at ground level in 2007. The hotel also removed two thousand air-conditioning units from windows. During the renovation, a Fordham University student sued the Unification Church, alleging that her dormitory room (which was not part of the Ramada hotel) had an infestation of bedbugs.

The 2008 financial crisis caused a decrease in business, prompting the New Yorker to reduce its payroll by 25 percent during early 2009. The hotel's renovation was completed in February 2009 at a final cost of $70 million. Following the renovation, the New Yorker had 912 guestrooms, including 64 suites. Some of the commercial space on the lower stories was converted back to guestrooms, which spanned the 19th to 40th stories. In addition, the hotel expanded its meeting facilities to 33,000 sq ft (3,100 m^{2}) across two ballrooms and twelve conference rooms. The completion of the project coincided with a decrease in tourism due to the recession of 2007–2009, prompting the hotel's managers to reduce room rates. To celebrate the hotel's 80th anniversary, in 2010, its managers offered discounted room rates to guests who were at least 80 years old. The Unification Church, which still owned the hotel building, began marketing 287,000 ft^{2} (26,700 m^{2}) of office space on five of the lower floors in 2011.

==== 2010s modifications, Wyndham and Lotte operation ====
The Unification Church began renovating the New Yorker Hotel again in 2013 for $30 million. The church sought to attract business travelers in anticipation of the Hudson Yards and Manhattan West redevelopment projects and the 7 Subway Extension. To make the hotel more appealing to business travelers, the church installed laundry machines on each of the hotel's dormitory stories, freeing up space for meeting rooms within the former laundry room in the basement. After some of the office tenants' leases expired, the church converted some office space into additional rooms. The church planned to eventually expand the hotel to 1,500 rooms by converting 270,000 ft^{2} (25,000 m^{2}) of office space. The hotel added 114 rooms in January 2014, in advance of Super Bowl XLVIII.

The Wyndham Hotel Group, which operated both the midscale Ramada chain and the upscale Wyndham chain, rebranded the New Yorker as a Wyndham hotel that March. At the time, the hotel had 1,083 rooms. After the New Yorker became part of the Wyndham chain, the hotel's operators planned to upgrade the hotel's signage with color-changing LEDs, similar to those on the Empire State Building three blocks east. Also in 2014, the Bar Below Kitchen & Cocktail Vault was announced for the hotel's basement. The Butcher and Banker steakhouse, developed by restaurateur Matt Abramcyk, opened within the former Manufacturers Trust bank branch in November 2017.

In July 2023, M&T Bank began looking to sell the $106 million loan that it had placed on the New Yorker. Yellowstone Real Estate Investments bought the loan that September. The same month, the New York City Department of Finance publicized a deed transfer document indicating that a guest named Mickey Barreto had fraudulently attempted to transfer ownership of the hotel from his own company to himself in 2021, despite never having owned the hotel. Barreto had argued that a clause in the state's rent-regulation laws made him the hotel's owner, because he had claimed ownership of one room and because ownership of the hotel had not been subdivided; although the New York Supreme Court had invalidated Barreto's claim of ownership. In February 2024, the New York County District Attorney's office charged Barreto with 24 counts, including 14 for fraud, after he repeatedly misrepresented himself as the hotel's owner; he later pleaded guilty to fraud in 2026 and was sentenced to six months in prison plus five years of probation. By 2025, Korean chain Lotte Hotels & Resorts had taken over the New Yorker Hotel.

== Notable people ==
=== Staff ===
Hotel management pioneer Ralph Hitz was selected as its first manager, eventually becoming president of the National Hotel Management Company. An early ad for the building boasted that the hotel's "bell boys were 'as snappy-looking as West Pointers'" and "that it had a radio in every room with a choice of four stations". A New Yorker bellboy, Johnny Roventini, served as tobacco company Philip Morris's pitchman for twenty years, popularizing their "Call for Philip Morris" advertising campaign.

=== Guests ===
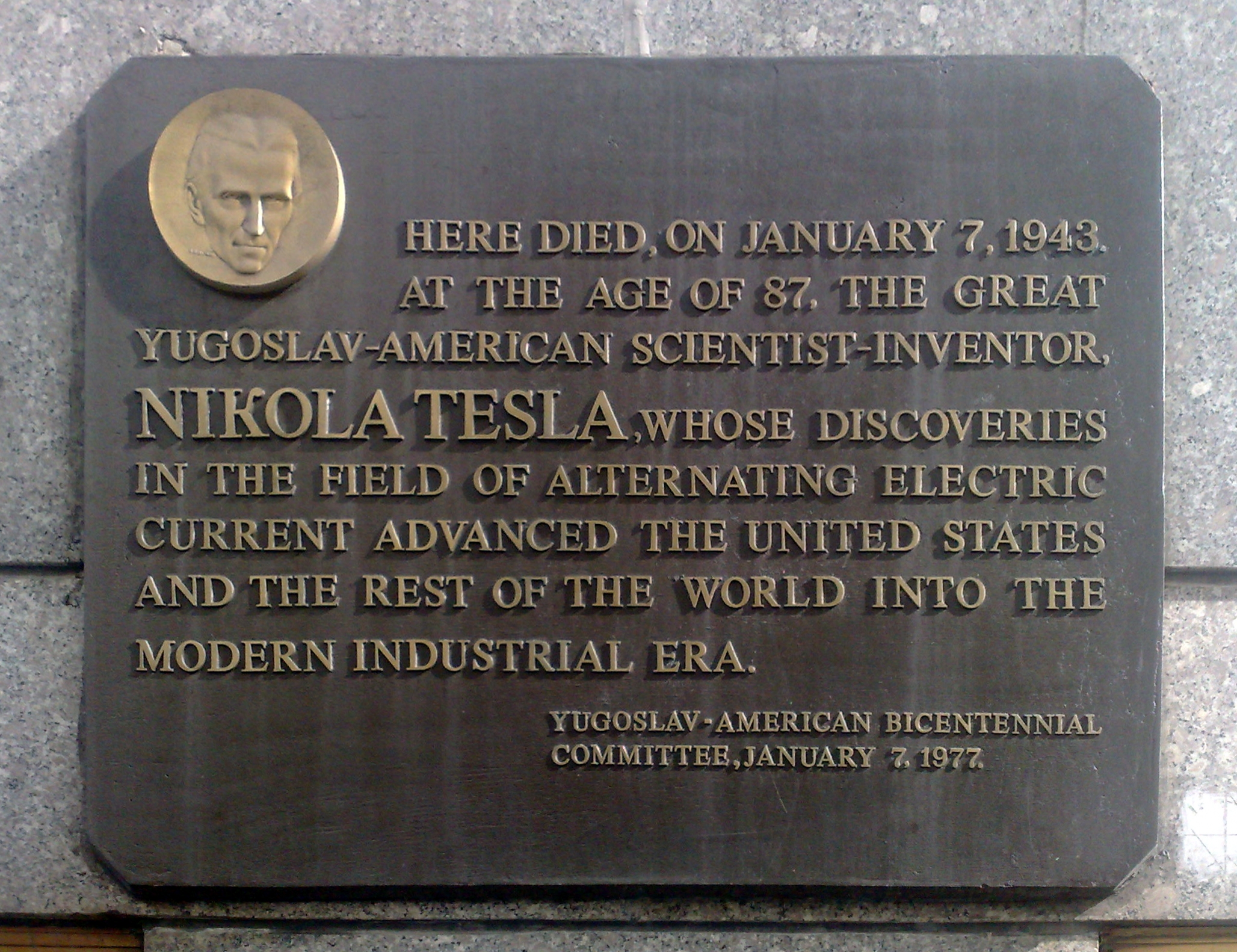
Plaque honoring Nikola Tesla, who lived in the hotel for ten years until he died

The New Yorker hosted the headquarters of Major League Baseball (MLB)'s National League in its early years, complementing the Commodore Hotel across midtown, which hosted MLB's American League. During the 1941 World Series, the hotel housed the Brooklyn Dodgers, who were competing against the New York Yankees. One 1945 advertisement for the hotel featured Federal Bureau of Investigation director J. Edgar Hoover. In May 1949, the hotel hosted the first concurrent annual meetings of the Amateur Hockey Association of the United States, the Canadian Amateur Hockey Association, and the International Ice Hockey Federation.

The hotel's guests included such figures as Spencer Tracy, Joan Crawford, and Fidel Castro. The actor Mickey Rooney frequented the first iteration of the hotel, and John F. Kennedy also stayed there while serving in the U.S. Senate. Muhammad Ali recuperated there after his March 1971 fight against Joe Frazier at the Garden. The New Yorker also hosted many popular big band artists, such as Peggy Lee, Glenn Miller, Benny Goodman, and Tommy Dorsey.

The inventor Nikola Tesla lived in room 3327 at the hotel during the final years of his life. Tesla gave speeches to reporters every year on his birthday until he died there in 1943. By the 2000s, The New Yorker magazine wrote that Tesla's presence had attracted three kinds of guests, namely "electrical engineers and technology enthusiasts; people interested in U.F.O.s, anti-gravity airships, death-ray weapons, time travel, and telepathic pigeons; Serbs and Croats."

== Impact ==
=== Critical reception ===
A reviewer for The Washington Post wrote in 1999 that the hotel was popular among large groups, saying: "If being close to the action is important to you, you won't be unhappy. If you want a good night's sleep . . . well, make sure you're not on a floor occupied by, say, a high school band." A reviewer for The New York Times praised their room in 2000 as "clean, reasonably sized, and with a lovely vintage tiled prewar bathroom", but criticized the lack of soundproof windows, the crowded lobby, and the gritty character of surrounding neighborhood. Similarly, an Ottawa Citizen reporter said: "True, the 40-floor art deco hotel has a somewhat dingy exterior, but the location (near Madison Square Garden, Penn Station and Macy's) and the views (maximized by having guest rooms from the 19th floor up) belie the first impression." By contrast, a writer for the National Post called the New Yorker "a nice but unglamorous hotel" in 2001. The New York Observer wrote in 2011, "There was nothing bespeaking the New Yorker's pre-Moonie swagger, save for maybe the piano against the wall, behind a superfluous red cordon."

After the New Yorker Hotel came under the Wyndham brand in 2014, it received mixed reviews. A reviewer for Oyster.com said, "The nice bright rooms, convenient location [...] and rich history make the 912-room Wyndham New Yorker a reasonable pick for the price", though they noted that the hotel's rooms were quite small. Similarly, the U.S. News & World Report said that many guests praised the Wyndham New Yorker's "comfortable accommodations" but criticized the hotel's small rooms and facility fees.

=== Replica ===
The New York-New York Hotel and Casino in Paradise, Nevada, contains a replica of the New Yorker Hotel, which measures 38 stories tall. A portion of the New York-New York's interior was also designed to resemble the New Yorker Hotel's interior.

== See also ==
- Art Deco architecture of New York City
- List of hotels in New York City
