= Emerita Torres =

New York politician

Emérita Torres
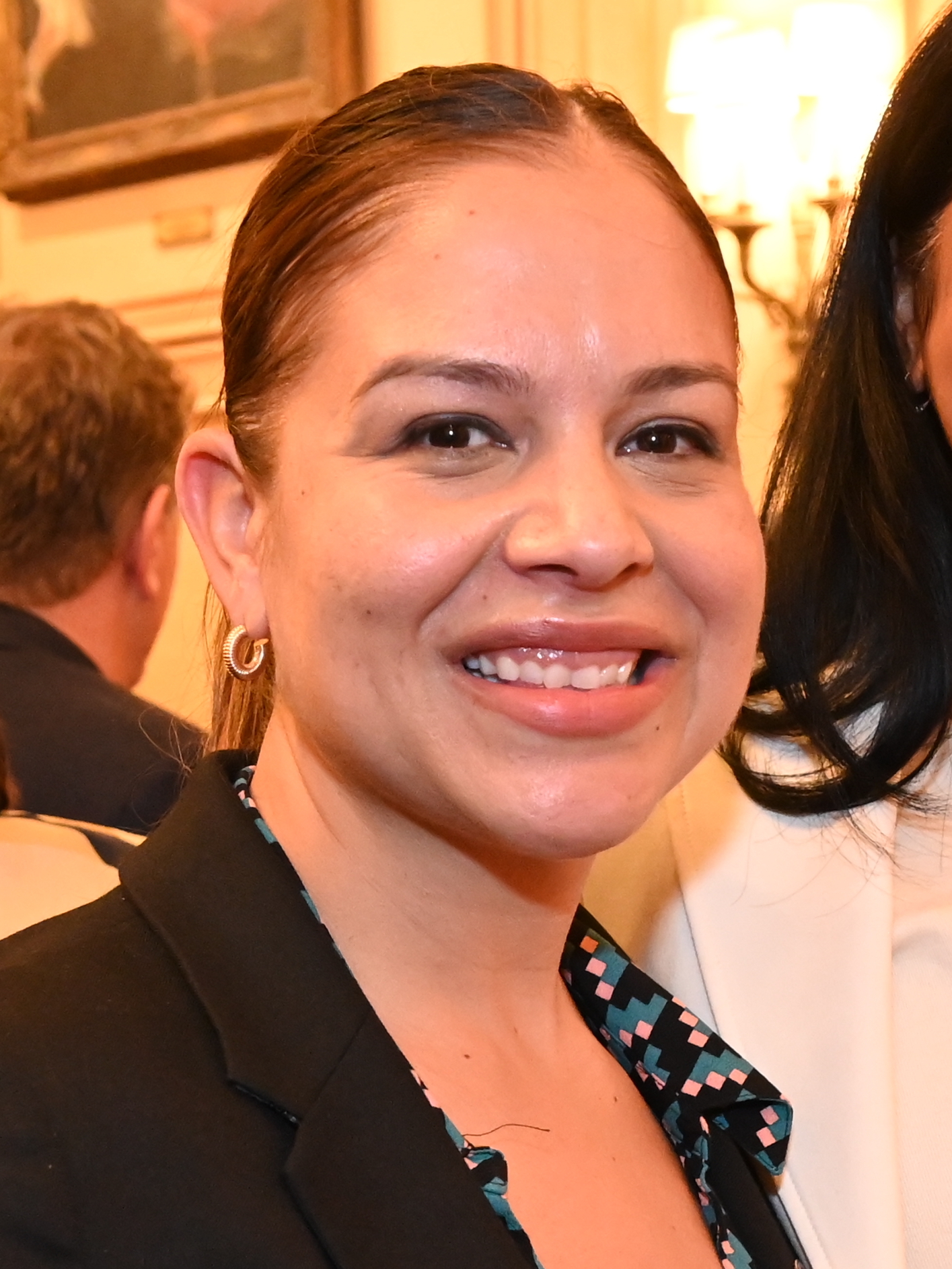
- Torres in 2025

Member of the New York State Assembly from the 85th district
- Incumbent
- Assumed office January 1, 2025
- Preceded by: Kenny Burgos

Personal details
- Party: Democratic
- Education: New York University (BA); Harvard University (MPP)
- Website: Campaign website State Assembly website

Emerita Torres (or Emérita Torres) is an American Democratic Party politician who was elected in 2024 to represent New York State Assembly district 85 for the 2025–2026 term.

== Early life and education ==
Torres was born in The Bronx. She studied history at New York University, then earned a master's degree in Public Policy at the Harvard Kennedy School.

== Career ==
Torres was a diplomat in the United States Department of State, working in Brazil, Pakistan, Colombia, Washington, DC, and the U.S. Mission to the United Nations, among others. She worked on a variety of issues, including economic development, human rights, racial justice, and labor rights for ten years before resigning to work on similar policy matters in New York.

Torres worked at The Soufan Center after returning to New York.

Since 2020, Torres has been the Vice President of Policy, Research, and Advocacy at the Community Service Society of New York, an anti-poverty nonprofit organization. In this position she advocated for low-income New Yorkers and developed policy on affordable housing, transit justice, and economics.

When Assembly Member Kenny Burgos announced his resignation in July 2024, leaving his seat vacant until the general election, she was the favorite to be selected by the Bronx Democratic Party as his replacement on the ballot and to be the likely winner in the safely Democratic district. At the time, she was a state Democratic committee member.

Torres ran on a platform of more jobs, affordable housing, and quality healthcare. She advocates help for local businesses, better enforcement of tenant protections, more housing, and more funding for public schools.

== Election results ==
2024 New York State's 85th Assembly District General Election
Party	Candidate	Votes	%
Democratic	Emerita Torres	20,881	79%
Republican	Kelly Atkinson	4,949	18.4%
Conservative	Gary Lutz	685	2.6%
