= Kenny Burgos =

American politician

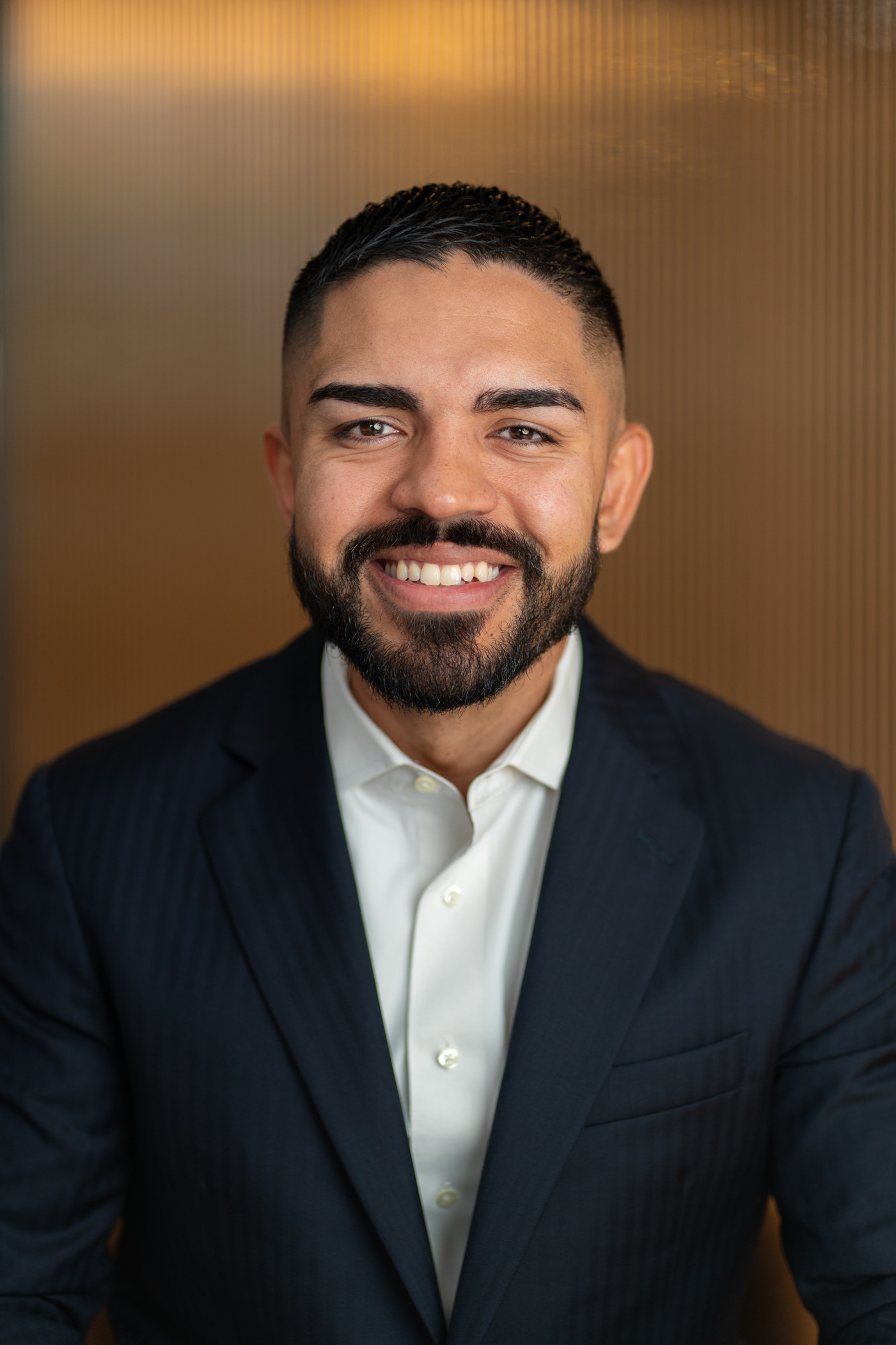

Member of the New York State Assembly from the 85th district
- In office November 12, 2020 – July 19, 2024
- Preceded by: Marcos Crespo
- Succeeded by: Emerita Torres

Personal details
- Born: The Bronx, New York, U.S.
- Party: Democratic
- Education: University at Albany, SUNY (BA)
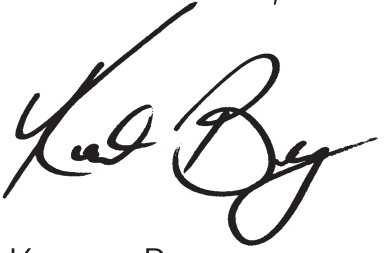
- Signature

Kenneth Burgos is an American politician from the state of New York. A Democrat, Burgos represented the 85th district of the New York State Assembly, based in the southeastern Bronx, starting in November 2020. On July 19, 2024, Assemblymember Burgos resigned from the Assembly for personal reasons, then announced he would serve as CEO of the New York Apartment Association.

== Early life ==
Burgos and his three sisters were raised in the Bronx by a single mother. He attended the Bronx High School of Science, where his class was two years below that of fellow future Democratic Assemblyman Zohran Mamdani, and graduated from University at Albany, SUNY with a Bachelor of Arts degree in Economics. Burgos is a member of Iota Phi Theta fraternity.

== Political career ==
In February 2020, Marcos Crespo – Assemblyman for the 85th district and chair of the Bronx County Democratic Party – announced his resignation. Burgos announced he would run for the seat and, with the backing of the Bronx County Democratic Committee, defeated William Moore 62-38% in the Democratic primary. Burgos easily won the general election in the strongly Democratic seat, and was seated on November 12, 2020.

In July 2024, Burgos resigned from the New York State Assembly and later became the Chief Executive Officer of New York Apartment Association, an organization that represents a coalition of property owners and managers who provide affordable multi-family housing in the state of New York.

New York State Assembly
| Preceded by Marcos Crespo | New York State Assembly, 85th District; 2020–2024 | Vacant |
