= Pan Am Equities =

- Company type: Privately held company
- Industry: Real estate
- Founder: Fraydun Manocherian
- Website: panamequities.com

Pan Am Equities is an American real estate development and property management company, owned by the Manocherian family.

The company focuses on the redevelopment of Upper East Side tenement blocks. Buildings owned by the company include: New York Tower at East 39th Street, the Caroline at 60 West 23rd Street, and New York Plaza at 2 Water Street. The family also owned the New York Health & Racquet Club, which permanently closed in 2020.

== History ==
=== 20th century ===
In 1978, after purchasing what is now known as New York Plaza at 2 Water Street, the building was identified as a potential landmark by the Landmarks Preservation Commission. Then dubbed "The Army Building", it was previously owned by the US Department of the Army. It was also the site of the first-ever US gay rights protest.

The Landmarks Committee scheduled a hearing in 1983 to begin the process for possible designation as a historic building. However, the Manocherian Brothers ordered their construction crews to proceed with demolishing the building - even though they did not have work permits. Because so much damage was done to the Army Building, the Landmarks Preservation Committee was not able to proceed with their cause and unrecoverable US history was lost.

=== 21st century ===
In 2014, the company bought two commercial condominiums on the Upper East Side, covering a total of 45,000 square feet. The seller was Philadelphia-based real estate investment fund manager, Equus Capital Partners.

In April 2016, Pan Am Equities sold 6 multi-family rental buildings in the East Village to The Lightstone Group for $127 million.

Pan Am purchased Marriott Pompano Beach Resort in Fort Lauderdale for $45.15 million in 2018. The firm later sold this property in November 2019 for $54.1 million.

In 2019, the firm announced the Glassell Park project, a 419-unit apartment complex located at the entrance of the new Bowtie State Park along the Los Angeles River. The project received harsh criticism from river activists. Pan Am also purchased a 50-unit rental building on 86th Street from Stonehenge Partners for $90 million; the sale price amounted to $1.8 million per unit.
