= Diana Dew =

Fashion designer (b. 1943, d. 2008)

Diana Dew (June 25, 1943 – February 8, 2008) was an American fashion designer recognized in the 1960s for pioneering electronic textiles which incorporated electronic components into wearable clothing. She created clothing that was battery powered and able to light up by adjusting a control knob. Dew's clothes were the precursor to more modern electronic textiles which use LED technology.

== Early life ==
Diana Dew was born on June 25, 1943, in Memphis, Tennessee. From the age of four to fourteen, she worked as a fashion model and attended the Memphis Academy of Art (now Memphis College of Art). She spent a year at Bard College studying method acting, before moving to the University of Florida to study engineering. Dew temporarily created stage costumes for Memphis' Front Street Theater before moving to California and enrolling at the University of California, Berkeley.

== Fashion design ==
Dew returned to New York City, where she participated in the East Side folk music scene and dressed Joan Baez. She then moved to Boston and started the cloth brand Isis, but she could not attract young customers that could afford her high-end creations. Following the suggestion from a modeling agency, she became a designer for Puritan's Paraphernalia business in the late summer of 1966, and later created her own company, Experipuritaneous.

Her creations, which involved "pliable and removable plastic lamps" powered by rechargeable nickel-cadmium batteries, could stay lit for up to 5 hours. The pace of the strobe-like flash, which projected a psychedelic light display, was controlled through a potentiometer worn at the waist. Her clothing premiered in February 1967 at the Paraphernalia store in New York City.

The use of electricity in her designs was not without problems, as expressed by Brigid Berlin, "Diana Dew, the electric-dress designer for Paraphernalia, had those dresses where the tits would light up; or you could flash the crotch and that would go off. But they weren't fool-proof, and one night two girls went totally off in Max's! I mean, right off. They went BOOM! It's true."

Dew rose to prominence as a musician's costume designer. She designed clothes for the trippy band Blues Magoos that would light up as the music became louder on stage. One of these outfits is currently housed in a Smithsonian Institution time capsule, which will be opened in 2065 as an example of 1960s art.

Dew's work was featured in the seminal show "Body Covering" at the Museum of Contemporary Craft in New York City in 1968, which explored the link between technology and clothing.

== Later life, death, and legacy ==
After a brief tenure with Creamcheese, an all-female rock band that performed in Dew's designs, Dew devoted her time and energy to hydroponic sprout cultivation and raising her three boys. She was married twice. In February 2008, she died at home and was cremated. She was survived by her three sons.

Images of her fashion are included in the National Museum of American History archives. One of her dresses was featured on the American PBS television program, Antiques Roadshow (season 24, episode 12).

== See also ==
- Tiger Morse
