= Marcos Crespo =

Puerto Rican politician (born 1980)

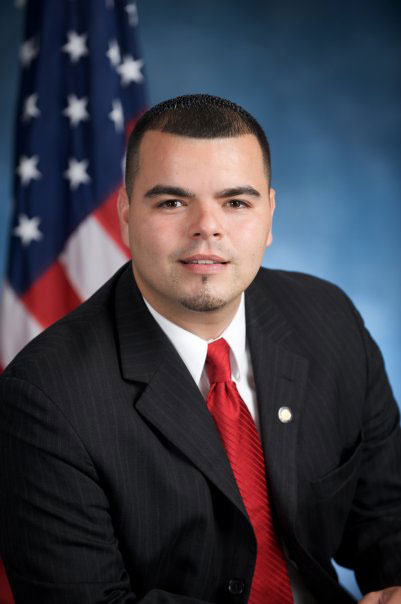

Chair of the Bronx County Democratic Committee
- In office March 5, 2015 – June 26, 2020
- Preceded by: Carl Heastie
- Succeeded by: Jamaal Bailey

Member of the New York State Assembly from the 85th district
- In office June 3, 2009 – June 27, 2020
- Preceded by: Rubén Díaz Jr.
- Succeeded by: Kenny Burgos

Personal details
- Born: July 29, 1980 (age 46) Guayama, Puerto Rico
- Party: Democratic
- Education: City University of New York, John Jay (BA)
- Website: Official website

Marcos A. Crespo (born July 29, 1980) is a former Democratic member of the New York State Assembly representing the 85th Assembly District, which includes the Soundview, Clason Point, Longwood, and Hunts Point sections of the South Bronx.

Born in Guayama, Puerto Rico, Crespo and his family moved to New York City when he was a young child. Crespo also spent some time in Lima, Peru, in his young years, thus shaping Crespo's views about the conditions of other countries.

He enrolled in John Jay College of Criminal Justice in 1996, pursuing a degree in government studies. In 2003, he participated in the State Assembly's internship program, where he was assigned to work with Assemblyman Rubén Díaz Jr. Crespo earned his B.A. degree in 2004, after which he got a position as assistant to New York State Senator Rubén Díaz Sr.

Crespo was first elected to the State Assembly in a June 2009 special election to replace Rubén Díaz Jr., who became Bronx Borough President in 2009.

== Early life and education ==
Crespo was born in Guayama, Puerto Rico, on July 29, 1980, one of four children of Ivette Fontanez and Alberto Crespo. At a young age, Crespo moved with his family to New York City, where he attended New York City public schools. Crespo also spent three years living in Lima, Perú, where he completed fourth and fifth grades while attending Santa Tersesita. He returned to Puerto Rico with his younger sister and his mother and completed high school at Carmen Bozello de Huyke High School, but soon thereafter, returned to New York to live with his father.

Marcos is a graduate of John Jay College of Criminal Justice earning a bachelor of arts in politics and government, is married and has two young daughters.

== Career ==
Crespo was one of the youngest members of the New York State Legislature when first elected in 2009. His proposal to create an emergency energy backup system for the State’s health and safety infrastructure during a natural disaster was included in the 2013-2014 State Budget.

In April 2013, Crespo was appointed to the Chairmanship of the Assembly Task Force on New Americans, and in March 2015, he was appointed by Assembly Speaker Carl Heastie to the Chairmanship of the Assembly Puerto Rican/Hispanic Task Force and the Task Force on Demographic Research and Reapportionment. In the Assembly, Crespo authored an anti-fraud bill to protect immigrants that passed both houses of the legislature and worked to expand legal services to underserved communities outside New York City. In the Bronx, Crespo has pushed for Metro-North Railroad service that will cut commuting time into Manhattan by an hour and worked on improving traffic congestion and air quality for the neighborhoods near Hunts Point Terminal Market by building an additional ramp to the Bruckner Expressway, thereby removing hundreds of trucks from local roads. He has fought to secure the remaining funding needed to finish the last phase of the Starlight Park trail.

Crespo has also fought to remove tons of garbage trucked into the Bronx each day from Manhattan, which pollutes Bronx neighborhoods and sickens its residents with severe respiratory diseases. He has called for the building of the Ganesvoort Recycling Facility in Manhattan in order to make Manhattan residents responsible for their own garbage.

In 2015, Crespo was unanimously elected Chair of the Bronx County Democratic Committee, replacing Carl Heastie, who gave up the role when elected Speaker of the New York State Assembly. Crespo was nominated for the post by his Assembly colleague, Jeffrey Dinowitz, and the nomination was seconded by New York City Councilwoman Vanessa Gibson.

In 2020 after 11 years as a member of the New York State Assembly Marcos Crespo joined Montefiore Medical Center in The Bronx where he was named Senior Vice President, Community Affairs.

== Committee membership ==
Crespo belongs to these committees.

- Chair, Puerto Rican/Hispanic Task Force
- Member, Committee on Alcoholism and Drug Abuse
- Member, Committee on Cities
- Member, Committee on Energy
- Member, Committee on Environmental Conservation
- Member, Committee on Insurance
- Member, Committee on Transportation
- Member, Black, Puerto Rican, Hispanic & Asian Legislative Caucus
- Co-Chair, Legislative Task Force on Demographic Research and Reapportionment

== Election results ==
- November 2018 general election, NYS Assembly, 85th AD

Marcos A. Crespo (DEM)	...	20,783
Shonde M. Lennon (REP)	...	805
Joseph Bogdany (CON)	...	167

- November 2016 general election, NYS Assembly, 85th AD

Marcos A. Crespo (DEM)	...	25,812
Janelle M. King (REP)	...	1,033
Barbara Santander (CON)	...	408
Daniel Zuger (GRN)	...	419

- September 2016 Democratic primary election, NYS Assembly, 85th AD

Marcos Crespo	...	2,635
William R. Moore	...	972

- November 2014 general election, NYS Assembly, 85th AD

Marcos Crespo (DEM)	...	9,408
Janelle M. King (REP)	...	357

- September 2014 Democratic primary election, NYS Assembly, 85th AD

Marcos Crespo	...	2,745
William R. Moore	...	874

- November 2012 general election, NYS Assembly, 85th AD

Marcos A. Crespo (DEM - WOR)	...	24,997
Janelle King (REP)	...	620
Eduardo Ramirez (CON)	...	324
Daniel Zuger (GRN)	...	122

- November 2010 general election, NYS Assembly, 85th AD

Marcos A. Crespo (DEM)	...	11,213
Leopold L. Paul (REP)	...	438
Arturo Santiago, Jr. (CON)	...	305

- June 2009 special election, NYS Assembly, 85th AD

Marcos Crespo (DEM - WOR)	...	1,331
Leopold L. Paul (REP)	...	106

New York State Assembly
Preceded by Ruben Diaz, Jr.	New York State Assembly, 85th District; 2009–2020	Succeeded by Kenny Burgos
Party political offices
Preceded by Carl Heastie	Chairman of the Executive Committee of the Bronx County Democratic Committee; 2015 - 2020	Succeeded by Jamaal Bailey
