= New York Apartment Association =

New York City-based landlord group

- Abbreviation: NYAA
- Founded: 2024; 2 years ago
- Merger of: Community Housing Improvement Program; Rent Stabilization Association
- Headquarters: New York City, New York
- Location: United States
- CEO: Kenny Burgos
- Website: housingny.org

The New York Apartment Association is a trade association that represents landlords of rent-stabilized units in New York City. It was formed in 2024 through the merger of the Community Housing Improvement Program and the Rent Stabilization Association.

== History ==
The Community Housing Improvement Program was founded in 1966 by William A. Moses.

The NYAA was formed in 2024 through the merger of the Community Housing Improvement Program and the Rent Stabilization Association and announced that Kenny Burgos, a former member of the New York State Assembly, as its CEO.

=== Political activism ===
In May 2025, the group announced it would spend $2 million in the 2025 New York City Council election through a new super PAC called "Housing for All" backing Julie Menin, Kevin Riley, Crystal Hudson, Ty Hankerson, and Rachel Storch while spending against Chris Marte. In June, it announced a $2.5 million ad campaign supporting Andrew Cuomo in the 2025 New York City Democratic mayoral primary and criticized Zohran Mamdani's plan for a rent freeze.
