= Fraydun Manocherian =

American businessman

- Born: 1932 (age 93–94)
- Occupations: Real estate developer, film maker and author
- Spouse: Jennifer Ann Robbins
- Children: Kimberly Manocherian Strelov; John Manocherian; Jed Manocherian; Greg Manocherian; Cara Manocherian Hamlin
- Family: Bernice Manocherian (sister-in-law)

Fraydun "Fred" Manocherian (born 1932) is an American real estate developer, author, founder of the National Road Safety Foundation, and founder of the New York Health & Racquet Club chain.

== Biography ==
Manocherian, raised Baha’i, was born in 1932 to a family of Persian Jewish descent, the son of Yahya Manocherian and his wife Touba (née Lalezari). He has one sister, Touran Manocherian Yaghoubzadeh; and three brothers: Amir Houshang, Eskandar, and Manouchehr. He and his brothers founded Manocherian Brothers and Pan Am Equities, which focused on the redevelopment of Upper East Side tenement blocks. In 1973, Manocherian, a fitness enthusiast, founded the New York Health & Racquet Club chain which eventually became the largest fitness chain in New York City. He also founded the New York Stress & Research Center.

In 1955, he became an advocate for federal funding of public education in traffic safety after two of his high school friends were killed by a drunk driver. In 1962, he founded the National Road Safety Foundation. In 1970, he wrote Flesh, Metal & Glass, a book about auto safety which included his Manocherian Chart. He and attorney Leonard J. Robbins founded The Manocherian-Robbins Foundation tasked with reducing the death rate on the nation's roadways through public-service advertising and legislative lobbying.

In 2011, he wrote the fiction novel, My Father's Will: A Novel.

== Awards ==
Manocherian has received several awards due to his advocacy of automotive safety including the "Man of the Year" award from the New York Council for Civic Affairs, the "Man of the Year" award from the Greater New York Automobile Dealers Association, an Honorary Doctorate in Humane Letters from St. John's University, a Master of Arts degree from the International University of Communications in Washington, D.C., the 1997 Distinguished Service to Safety Award from the National Safety Council and the 2005 Public Service Award from the National Highway Traffic Safety Administration.

== Personal life ==
In 1959, he married Jennifer Ann Robbins, daughter of cookbook author Ann Roe Robbins. They had five children: Kim (born 1960), John (born 1962), Jed (born 1966), Greg (born 1967) and Cara (born 1974).

His brother, Eskander Manocherian (died 1999) was married to Bernice Manocherian, former president of AIPAC. In 1985, his daughter Kimberly Diana Manocherian married Jerome John Strelov in a Unitarian ceremony in Manhattan. Kim is the president of the New York Health & Racquet Club. His niece, Ellen (daughter of Manouchehr Manocherian), is married to real estate investor and landlord Kamran Hakim. His son Greg, was an executive producer for the 1989 film That's Adequate; and co-produced and co-wrote the script for the 1997 independent film Hudson River Blues with his mother. His son John was an executive producer for the 2005 film Dave Chappelle's Block Party.
