= Paper clothing =

Clothing made from paper

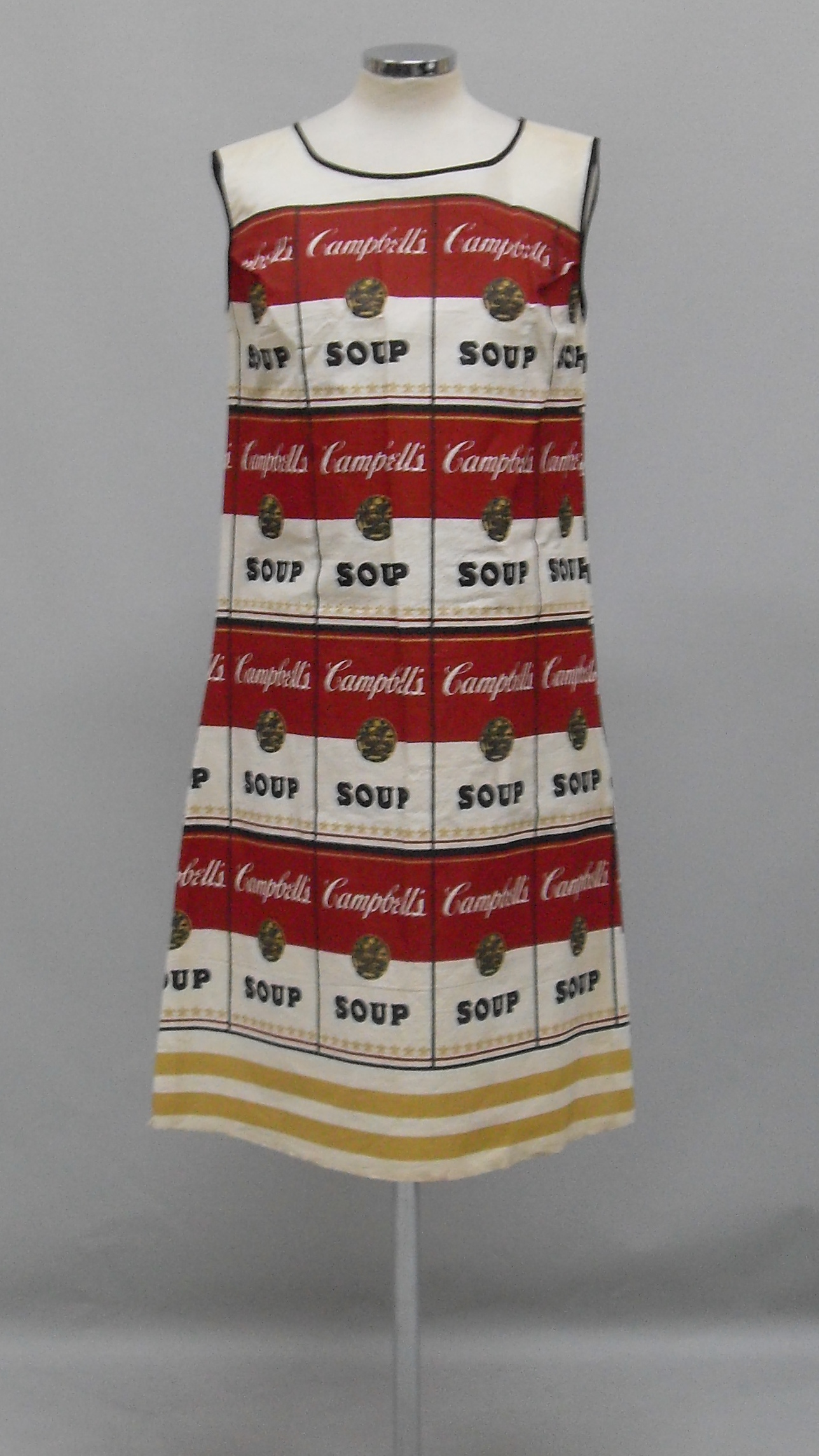
The Souper Dress, 1967. Promotional paper dress for Campbell's, directly referencing Andy Warhol's Campbell's Soup Cans works. PFF (2005.6.396)

Paper clothing refers to garments and accessories made from paper or paper substitutes.

The earliest known paper clothing was made by the Chinese even before they used paper as a writing medium in the 2nd century CE. Paper clothing, usually made from washi paper, was developed by the Chinese through the centuries, the craft spreading through Asia, until it reached Japan. From the 10th century onwards, Japanese craftspeople produced paper garments called kamiko. Kamiko became a traditional Japanese craft of Shiroishi, Miyagi, carried out to a very high standard and skill during the Edo period. The practice began to die out in the late 19th century, before being revived in the mid-20th century. In the early 20th century, German and Austrian manufacturers began producing "ersatz" paper cloth and clothing in response to wool shortages caused by World War I. While there was a brief period of interest in paper suits and garments during the early 1920s, this did not catch on as despite paper's economic advantages, traditional woven cloth was widely preferred. However, some fancy dress costumes, hats, and fashionable accessories were made from crêpe paper during the early 20th century and in response to resource shortages before and during World War II.

In the late 1950s, manufacturers of disposable paper goods such as the Scott Paper Company developed cellulose-based bonded fiber textiles, which were intended to be used for laboratory and medical garments. Although these textiles are not true paper, they are widely known and marketed as being equivalent to paper. In 1966, Scott offered two paper dresses as a promotional giveaway to accompany a range of disposable tableware, which escalated into a widespread craze for paper dresses and garments that lasted until 1969. The paper dress craze saw many artists and fashion designers creating or inspiring paper garments, including Andy Warhol, Ossie Clark, and Bonnie Cashin. At its height, one American manufacturer produced up to 80,000 dresses in a week. During the 1968 United States presidential election campaigns, most of the candidates had paper dresses printed to support their campaigns. In 1969, the paper dress craze rapidly died out, mainly fuelled by changes in fashion but also by increasing awareness of the issues with disposable consumer goods. Functional single-use paper clothing for protective, medical, and/or traveling needs remained commercially viable.

In the 1990s, paper was revisited as a fashion material as part of a throwback to the '60s, with designers such as Sarah Caplan and Hussein Chalayan becoming known for their work in paper or non-woven paper substitutes such as Tyvek. A significant collection of paper fashion was built in the first decade of the 21st century by the ATOPOS cultural foundation in Athens. In the form of an internationally traveling museum and art gallery exhibition, it has raised awareness of the innovation of paper and paper-substitutes as a fashion and wearable art material over the last millennium.

== History of paper clothing (pre-1965) ==
=== China ===
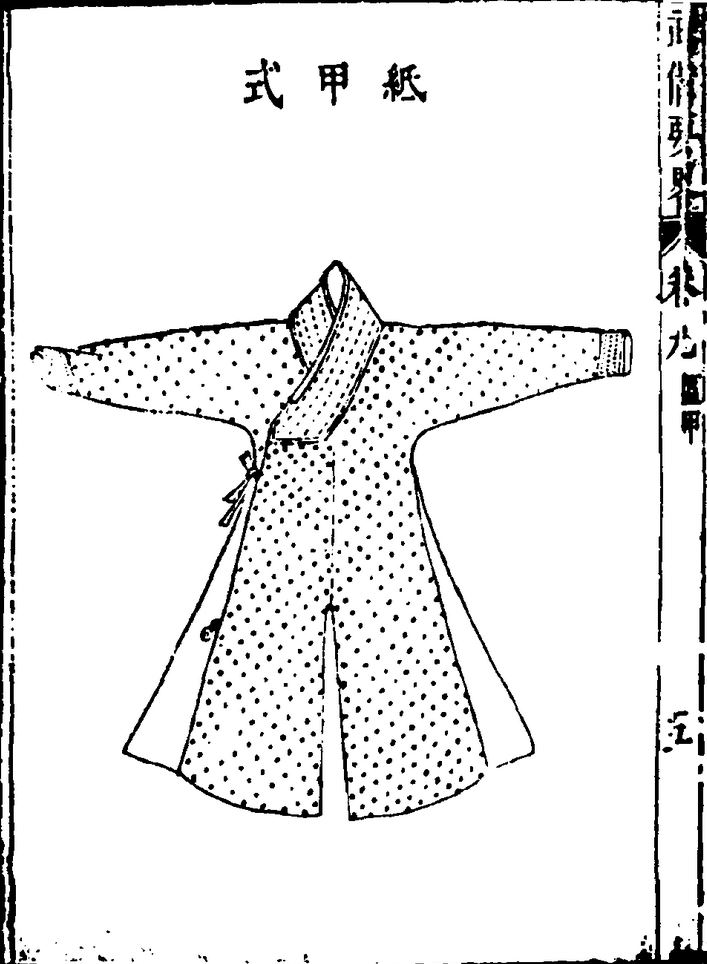
Chinese paper gambeson depicted in the Wubei Yaolue military manual (1632)

Paper clothing has a long history in China, predating the use of paper for writing purposes. The creation of the earliest form of modern paper is usually credited to Cai Lun (d.121 CE), a court official who lived during the Han dynasty. From the second century CE, the Chinese wore paper garments as protection against the cold, which were prized for their warmth and softness. Paper clothing is mentioned in records dating to the Wei dynasty (220-266), Jin dynasty (266-420) and Northern and Southern dynasties (420-589). Archaeological excavations in China have uncovered paper hats, shoes, and belts dating back to 418 CE. By the sixth century CE, the Chinese were using washi (mulberry paper made using ground bark, linen and hemp fibre) to make clothing. Paper-making technology was also applied to the manufacture of thick coats and military armour from a thicker, more cardboard-like material.

Some of the earliest records of paper armour are from the Tang dynasty (618-907 CE), where its invention as an accessible form of civilian self-protection is credited to Shang Suiding. Governor Xi Shang (847-94) of the city of He-Dong, close to Khitan territory, maintained a one-thousand soldier army whose pleated paper armour was noted as resistant to heavy arrows, essential for resisting Khitan archers. He-Dong militia were still wearing paper armour when the city was attacked a century later by the imperial Song army. Paper armour was worn by Southern Tang civilians during their wars with the Later Zhou in the 950s. Called 'White Armour Armies' due to their white paper armour, these Tang civilian armies were effective against smaller Zhou forces, although avoided confronting the larger armies. During the Song dynasty (960-1279), practical and functional paper garments prevailed among the literati and monks. Texts from the 1620s document the use of paper for blankets and armour. Such inventions and innovations eventually spread throughout Asia. Paper armour is also described in texts from the later Ming dynasty (1368-1644), including gambesons and arm-guards made from silk paper. By the time of the Qing dynasty (1644-1912), China (as well as Japan) were importing Korean papers for the use of armour, recognising its toughness and durability. In the late 19th century, the Hui people in Yunnan were still wearing armour made from 30-60 layers of bark paper, combined with silk and cotton. This was considered fairly effective against musket balls and bayonets, which got caught and deflected by the layers of paper, although the armour proved less protective against breech loading rifles fired at close quarters. Paper clothing gradually disappeared in modern era China due to the development of mechanized production and scientific and technological advances which led to the appearance of many new and diverse alternative textiles.

=== Japan ===
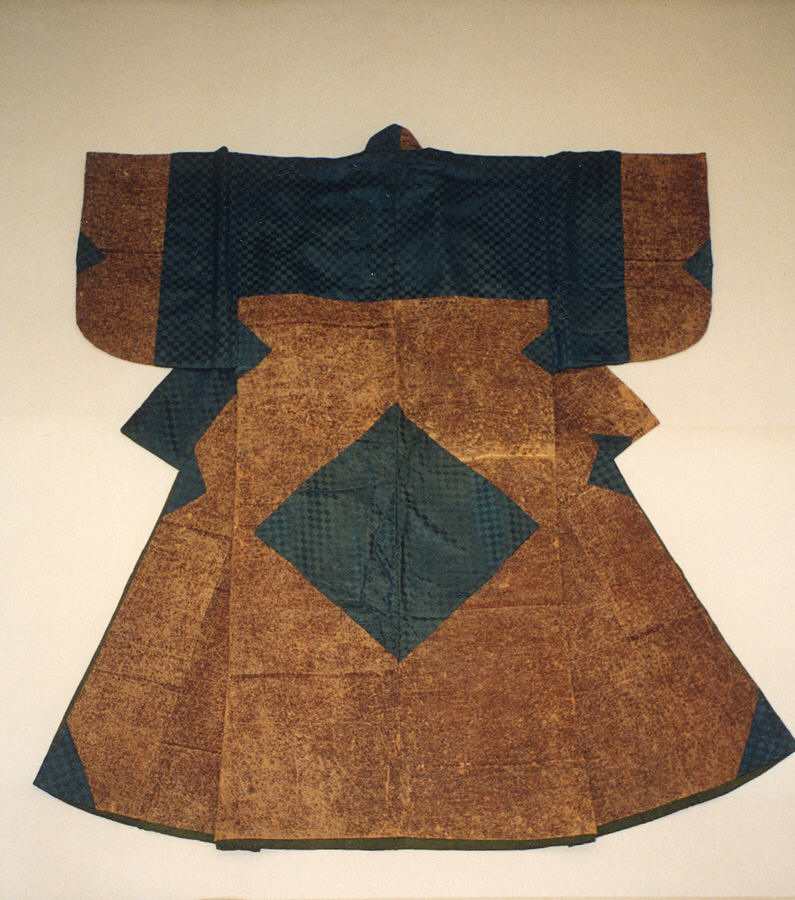
19th-century man's kamiko robe, washi paper with silk reinforcements. Metropolitan Museum, 1999.247.12

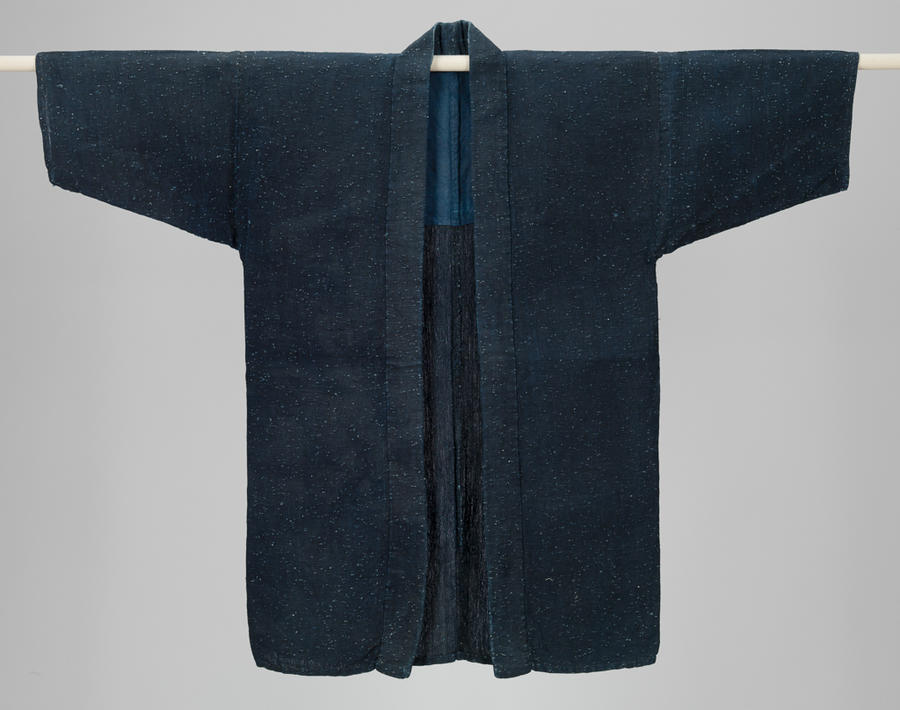
Early 1900s under-kimono, indigo-dyed shifu (spun and woven kōzo paper fibre), Japanese, 1900–20. RISD Museum

Paper in Japan was first created by Buddhist monks. The first paper garments in Japan were created by the monks for priests to wear as undergarments and robes. As early as 910 CE, monks were recycling their paper sutras (texts) into garments, which began a lasting tradition. Both Japanese farmers and the upper classes wore paper garments, not just out of necessity, but also for worship purposes, and as an aesthetic preference. These paper garments were called kamiko, a contraction of the Japanese word Kamikokoromo which translates as paper dress.

Paper clothing was worn in Japan during the Kamakura period (1192-1333), and by the 17th century, washi had become the most widely used paper not just for texts and images, but also for architectural screens, furnishing, and garments. The Edo period (1603-1868) saw kamiko reach its most widespread use, along with many other options where a paper textile was substituted for leather or cloth. At this time, paper attire became a desirable and fashionable status symbol. It also gained a key role in the kabuki theatre, where kamiko became the traditional costume for wagoto actors who wore it to show that their characters were fallible and physically weak as well as in financial straits. Kamiko costumes could also denote an overly fashionable individual or a nimaime (a handsome male character). The nimaime's paper costumes were often decorated with a calligraphy pattern called fumi-hogo (literally: "letters-wastepaper"), to suggest that due to financial pressure, he had had to make his kimono out of old love-letters.

One of the most significant areas of washi and kamiko manufacture was Shiroishi, Miyagi, which, for over four centuries was synonymous with sophisticated papermaking technology, including a form of embossed paper known as takuhon-shi. During the Edo period, washi was one of the "Three Whites of Shiroshi" (the other two were kudzu and umen noodles). The industry was protected by the Katakura clan, the Lords of Shiroishi Castle, whose patronage enabled washi production to flourish. The Tokugawa shogunate and the Imperial Court were presented with washi and kamiko as state gifts from the Date clan.

From the Meiji period (1868-1912) onwards, washi and kamiko were less in demand, and the skills and techniques almost became lost. In the 1920s and 1930s, some Shiroishi citizens asked elderly craftspeople who had been born in the Edo period to teach them the skills and techniques, and in 1940, Nobumitsu Katakura, the lord of Shiroishi Castle, founded the Oshu Shiroishi Kyodo Kogei Kenkujo (Oshu Shiroishi local crafts research institute) in liaison with Chutaro Sato, a local kimono seller, and artisan paper-maker Tadao Endo. The intention was to revive kamiko, shifu (woven paper-fibre) and washi production skills through research and surveys of Shiroishi's history and traditions. By 2017 the future of kamiko was once again in jeopardy; and in 2020, there were only four people in the city who still made kamiko and the specific washi, although another group of locals have started learning the skills from the original revivalists.

In Japan, washi is usually made using kōzo (paper mulberry), mitsumata, or ganpi. Kōzo is typically used, as unlike ganpi, it can be cultivated, and unlike mitsumata, it has long, narrow trunks and a rhizomatic structure creating long fibres that are easy to farm, harvest, and process. The mulberry paper is then kneaded to give it suppleness and flexibility, and treated with various plant-based substances such as konnyaku, a konjac-based starch used since the 18th century, which creates water-resistance and prevents the surface of the paper from pilling. Other agents used are agar, fermented persimmon tannin (kakishibu or kaki) or various seed and nut oils (including perilla, walnut, and poppy seed) that can improve the water- or bacteria-resistance of the end product, or strengthen the washi. The end result was paper fabric that could be cut, stitched and hand-laundered like normal cloth; and could even be used for fireman's uniforms. Kaki, when combined with starch and oil, makes washi that can be used for raincoats and umbrellas. The persimmon juice turns the paper brown, producing an alternative shade to white kamiko, which can also be printed with woodblocks to create patterns and color.

An alternative method of paper cloth production is shifu, a woven fabric made using spun washi yarn. Shifu was developed in sixteenth century Japan, and was used by the samurai to make ceremonial clothes.

In the early 21st century, white kamiko continues to be made specifically for participants to wear during the annual Buddhist rituals at Tōdai-ji, an important Buddhist temple in Nara.

=== America and Europe ===
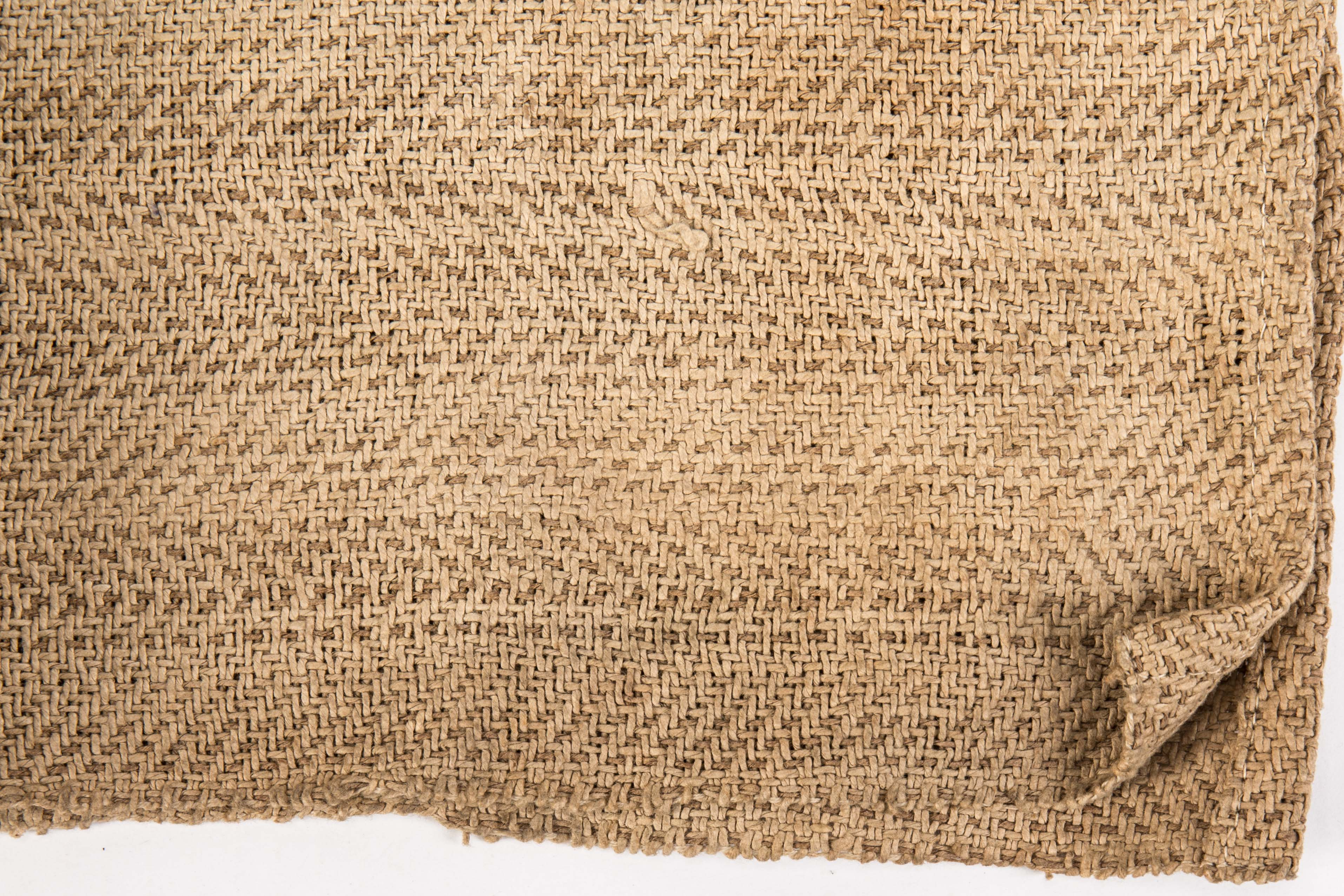
Ersatz cloth, woven paper, German, 1918–19 Auckland Museum, 1929.162.3-6

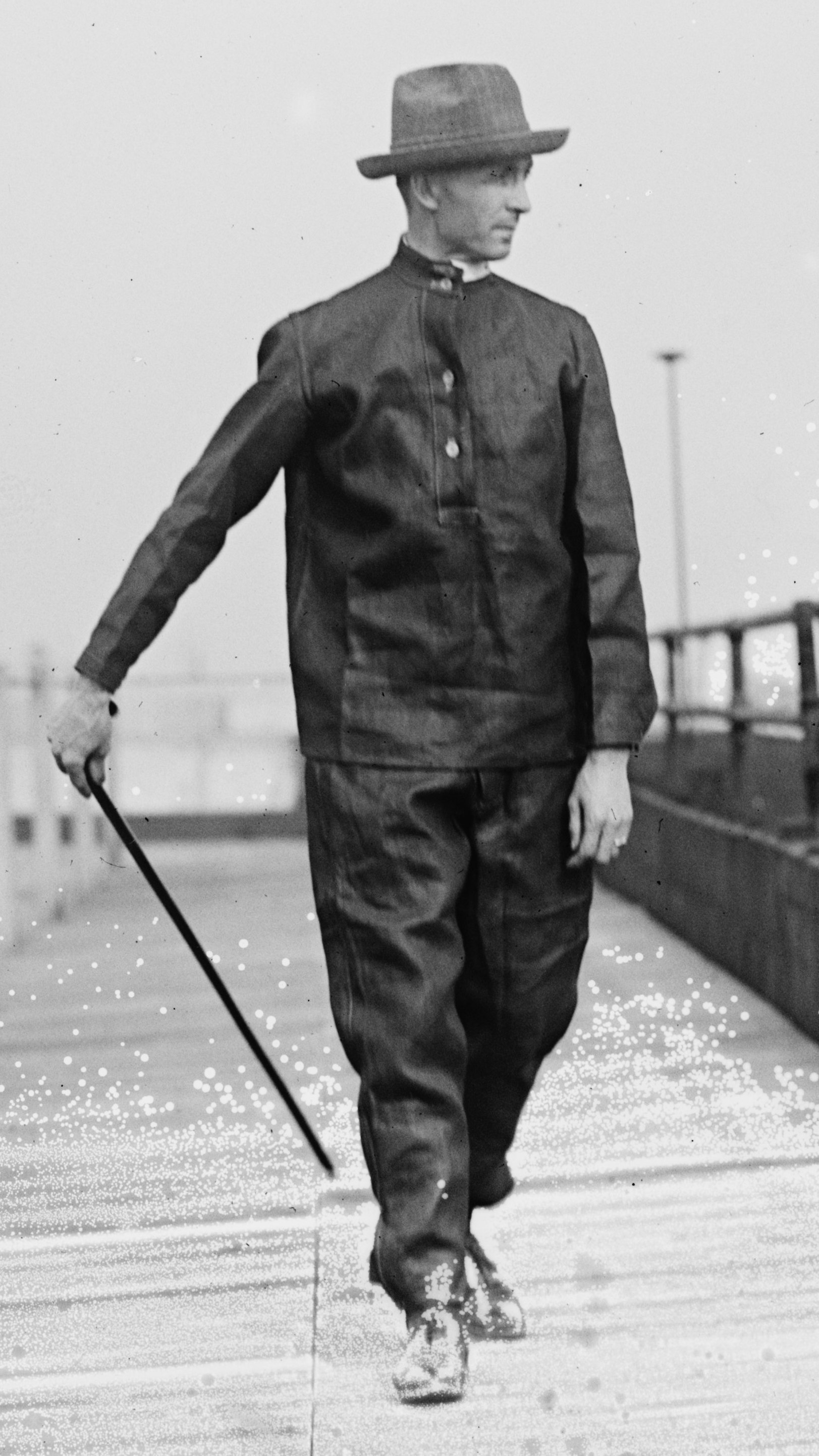
Man wearing a paper suit, 1920

In France in 1907, a thread made from paper was developed that was reported as being unshrinkable, damp-proof, fire-proof and two-thirds cheaper than cotton. The New York Times article announcing this was headlined "Paper Dresses Soon!" although this did not immediately happen.

World War I (1914-1918) caused severe fabric shortages, especially of wool, and ready-to-wear suits made from spun and woven paper were developed in Germany and Austria in response. By 1920, Italy, England and Turkey were all noted as having taken an interest in the new paper garments, with The Washington Evening Star reporting that in London, a German-made paper suit cost the equivalent of 46 cents to 2 dollars. The paper commented that an American client could buy a new paper suit each week of the year, and still spend less than if they purchased a single British woollen suit. Prior to April 1917, when the United States entered the war against Germany, the American press regularly reported on how German inventiveness had created substitutes ("ersatz") for many raw materials, admiringly commenting on how German-made spun paper twine could be not only woven into doilies, but also functional damp-resistant cloths that replaced sackcloth and could be used to make corsets, aprons, work garments, and even parts of military uniforms. In 1917, a paper raincoat was patented in the United States.

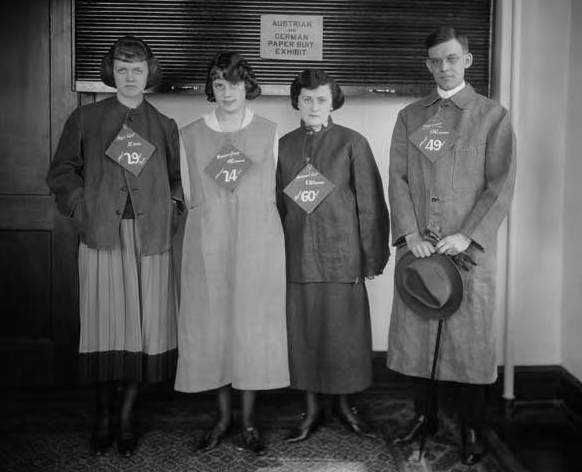
Austrian-made paper clothes with price tags, 1921

After the war, in September 1920, the Bureau of Foreign and Domestic Commerce in Washington, D.C. displayed a group of Austrian paper suits and other merchandise, before touring them around the U.S. This was intended to show American manufacturers that they had competition when it came to cheap clothing being manufactured elsewhere, and give them the opportunity to examine the paper clothing first-hand. However, trade publications commented disparagingly on the "coarse and crude" textiles and relatively few people were enthusiastic for paper clothing even though it could be washed and was cheap. One Philadelphia businessman wore a brown paper suit, paper necktie and shirt-collar, which cost him 89 cents altogether, as opposed to over 30 dollars for a wool suit. Paper bathing costumes were even available by 1921, with one Chicago manufacturer making a $1.50 costume that resisted rough treatment and water wear, and another Chicago establishment creating "straw" and "cloth" hats made from paper, even their feather trimmings. By the mid-1920s, American prosperity had reached such heights that most people could afford cloth and wool, and even the onset of the Great Depression in 1929 did not reawaken enthusiasm for paper garments. However, separate shirt-fronts, shirt-collars and cuffs could be made from paper, card, or plastics such as celluloid to give a clean, crisp starched appearance.

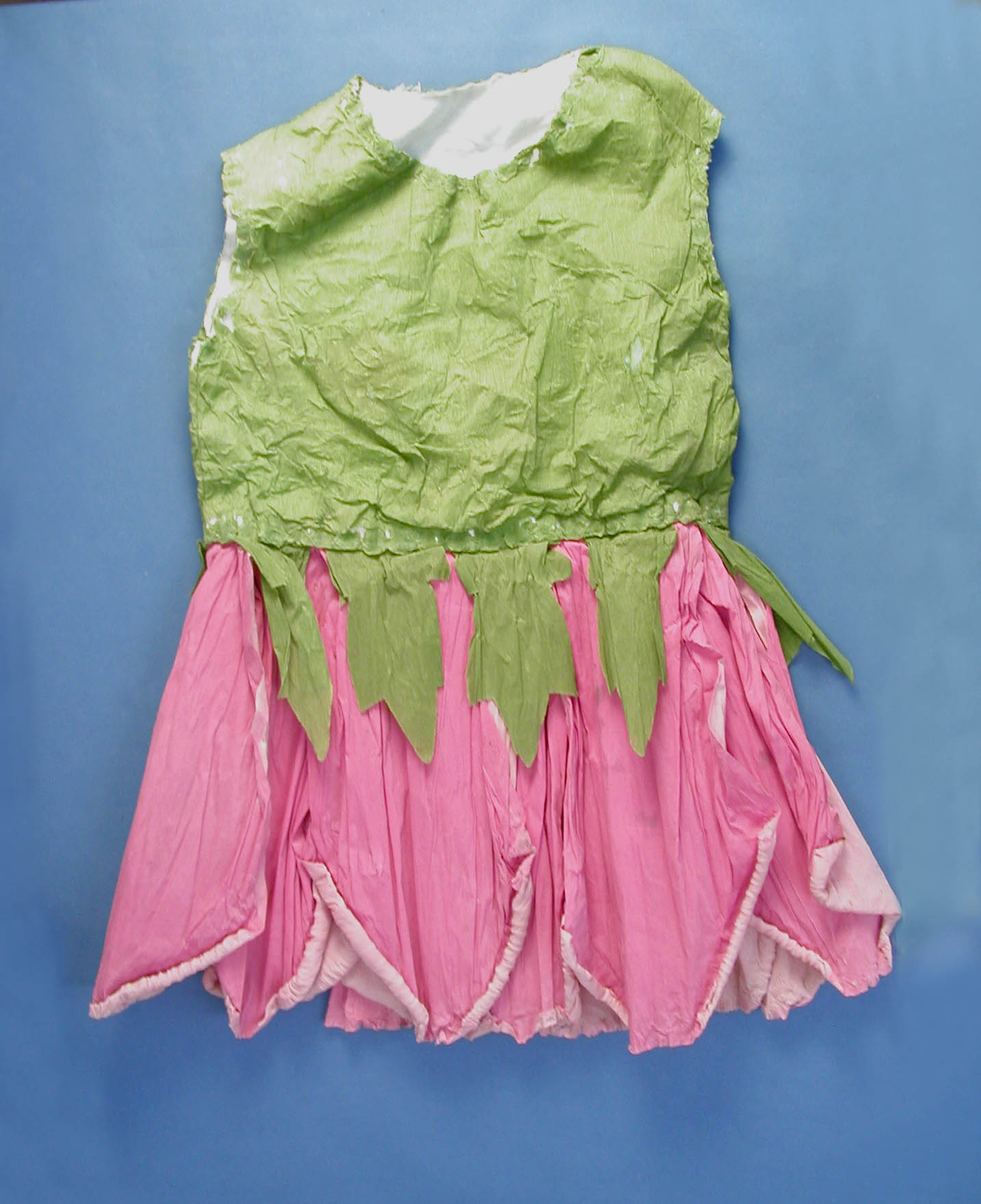
1928 child's "Rosebud" fancy dress costume, crêpe paper, New Zealand. Auckland Museum, 2002.104.1-1)

Crêpe paper was one of the few exceptions to the aversion to paper clothing from the late 1920s onwards, particularly as a material for making accessories or fancy-dress costumes from. While crêpe paper costumes and party dresses, particularly for small children, had been made since the 1890s as a way to create limited-use clothing for fast-growing wearers, the late 1910s saw an upsurge in the promotion of crêpe paper and other decorative papers for one-off costumes. Part of the appeal of crêpe paper was that it gave the appearance of gauze or georgette for a fraction of the cost, and could be had in various prints. Dennisons Manufacturing Co. was an American company specialising in paper products that published books offering instructions on how to make Halloween and fancy dress costumes out of crêpe paper, which they already manufactured. Newspapers suggested that crepe paper, if twisted tightly, could be crocheted or woven into stylish, rain-resistant hats, belts, handbags or accessories.

When World War II (1939-1945) caused another surge of fabric scarcity and government restrictions, paper once again became a substitute. During the Occupation of Paris, French milliners struggling with limited resources were forced to find creative solutions, and alongside wood-shavings and twine, newspaper and crêpe paper were pressed into service to manufacture innovative hats whose determined elegance and smartness acted as defiance towards the enemy. One such milliner, Rose Valois, made entire hats out of woven crêpe paper.

In the late 1950s, manufacturers such as the Scott Paper Company and Kimberly-Stevens developed bonded fabrics made from plant cellulose as a cheap and disposable alternative to traditional woven textiles in laboratory and healthcare environments. However, they resisted describing these non-woven materials as paper, as they felt it suggested weakness and fragility. Scott's rayon and cellulose bonded fabric was called Duraweave, and would go on to be the material for the first successful paper dresses in 1966, launching the late Sixties craze for mass-produced paper fashion.

== Paper fashion fad (1965-1969) ==
In 1965, an engineer for the Scott Paper Company asked his wife to design a simple dress in Duraweave to offer to prospective buyers in department stores. The garments failed to arouse commercial interest until April 1966, when Scott ran a promotional campaign for a new disposable tableware line, where they offered two different Duraweave dresses for $1.25 each via mail order, accompanied by a 52-cent voucher for the merchandise. The campaign took off, and before the year was out, Scott had received over 500 thousand orders for the "Paper Caper" designs (available in a red bandana print or an Op art pattern) and the paper dress fad of the Sixties kicked off. However, the price was so low that Scott made minimal profit, barely covering the production costs. After six months, Scott ceased production, saying that dress manufacturing was not something they wanted to do.

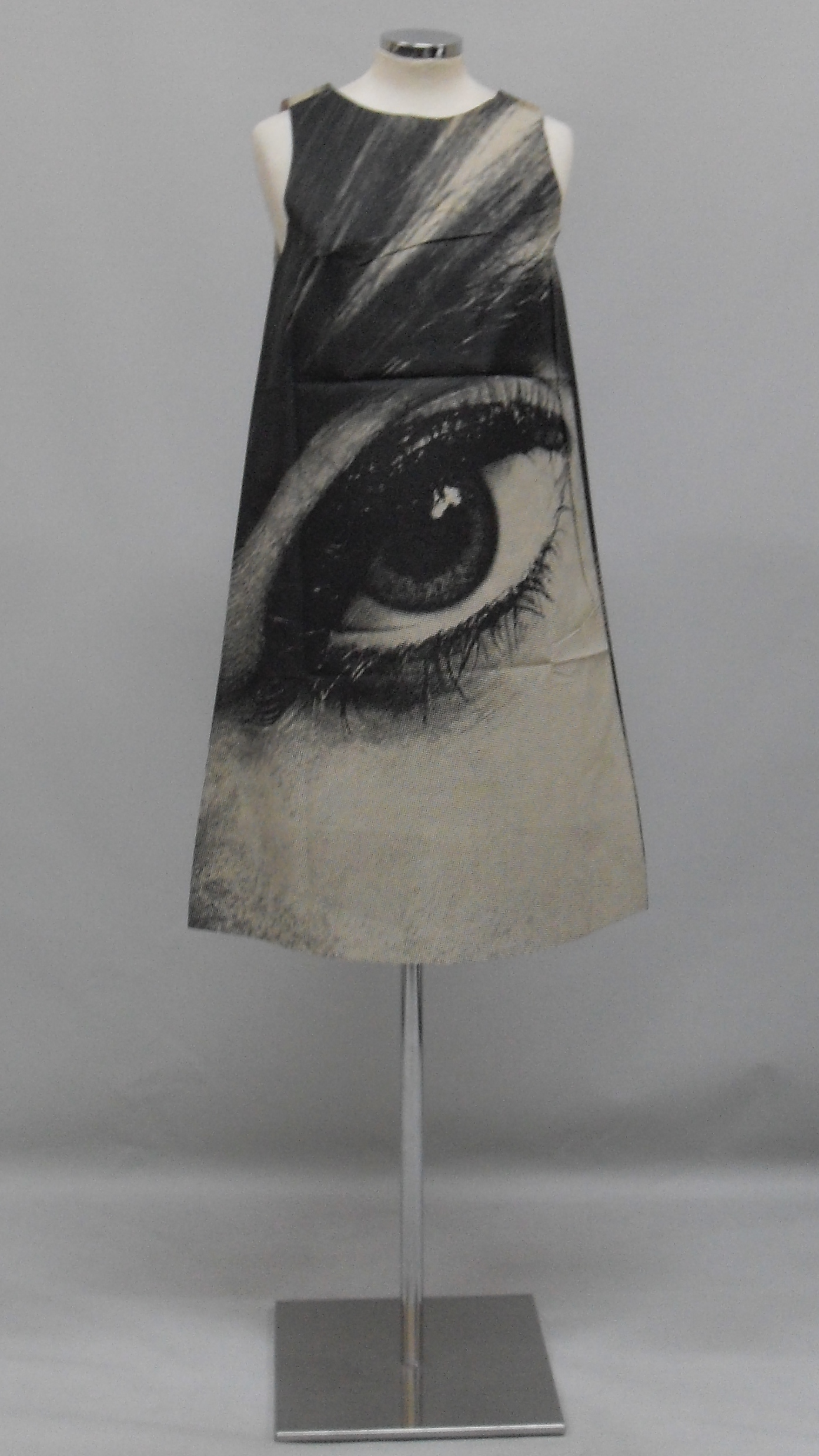
"Mystic Eye" paper dress, 1967. From the Harry Gordon "Poster Dresses" series. PFF

Elisa Daggs was one of the first to set themselves up as a paper fashion designer in 1966, creating wrap dresses, caftans and tent dresses that were sold by Neiman Marcus and other stores. She went on to design paper saris as air-stewardess uniforms for Air India and uniforms for Trans World Airlines stewardesses which had themes such as France, England, Italy and New York. Paper dresses and other disposable garments were sold through Caroline Little and William Guggenhem III's Manhattan boutique, In Dispensable Disposables (1965-1968) and Tiger Morse opened a "Teeny Weeny" shop that sold "materials of the future" such as synthetics, paper and plastic. By November 1966, paper dresses had become so popular that the Abraham & Straus department store in Brooklyn hired Andy Warhol to demonstrate how to paint pop art on plain white paper dresses by the Mars Manufacturing Company, which were sold with paintbrushes and boxes of watercolor paints for individual customizing. For the launch, Warhol personally silkscreened a design using the word "FRAGILE" onto the singer-actor Nico's dress during the event while she was wearing it, and signed it Dalí. Another dress at the event was decorated by Warhol with large cut-out screen-printed bananas, and both garments were donated to the Brooklyn Museum. The following month, the Wadsworth Atheneum held a Paper Ball, where famous fashion designers and artists, including Tzaims Luksus and Peter Max, were asked to create couture looks out of paper for the event. The television show I've Got a Secret featured Arlene Dahl at the event, modeling a paper gown by Luksus alongside four other paper couture looks. Thirty years previously, the Atheneum had hosted another "Paper Ball" with elaborate paper sets created by Pavel Tchelitchew and circus costumes by George Balanchine, Alexander Calder and Fernand Léger among others. This wearable art approach to paper fashion inspired many of the best-known paper dresses, such as the 1967 Souper Dress, a promotional design for the Campbell's whose print directly referenced Warhol's Campbell's Soup Cans, and Harry Gordon's 1967 "Poster Dress" series. The six Gordon dresses featured enlarged black-and-white photographs, and their packaging encouraged wearers to use the dress as a wall poster or pillow covering should they tire of wearing it. Gordon intended the Poster Dresses to be purposefully simple, affordable and accessible, as a form of protest against the increasing elaboration and complexity of commercial paper fashion.

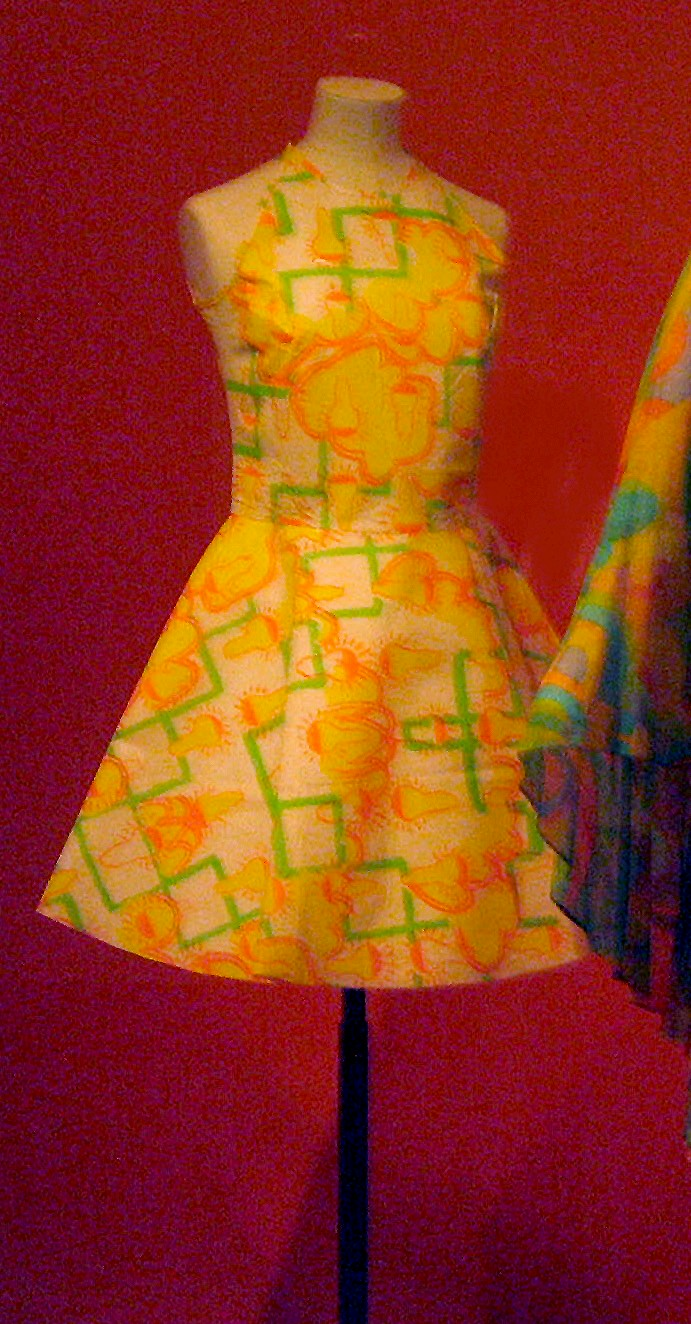
Paper dress by Zandra Rhodes and Sylvia Ayton for Miss Selfridge, 1966.

Paper fashion also had a presence in Britain from the beginning. In 1966, Ossie Clark collaborated with Zika Ascher to produce the first British paper dresses, simple shifts with short sleeves printed by Johnson & Johnson with a Celia Birtwell design. Also in 1966, Zandra Rhodes and Sylvia Ayton designed an exclusive paper dress for Miss Selfridge, although much of the stock was damaged by curious customers tearing to test whether it really was paper. Although he was American, the graphic artist Harry Gordon designed his 1967 Poster Dress series while living in London during the 1960s. The most successful British manufacturer of paper fashion was Dispo (Meyersohn & Silverstein Ltd). Which? magazine found that while most manufacturers' paper dresses did not last beyond a third wash, Dispo garments could withstand being washed up to six times.

By 1967, paper clothing merchandise in the United States had expanded dramatically, including not just dresses, but underwear, men's and children's clothing, and even raincoats and swimwear. Paper bikinis could be water-resistant enough to be used up to three times. At the beginning of the year, there was a paper shortage caused by demand for paper dresses, meaning that designers like Daggs were unable to meet their spring orders. The leading producer, Mars Manufacturing Co. of Asheville, North Carolina, reported selling 80,000 dresses a week, while Sterling Paper Products aimed to gross 6 million dollars a year through selling such paper garments as maternity dresses, a zebra-print pantsuit, and even a $15 wedding dress. Even established companies offered paper garments along their standard offerings, such as Formfit's $3 bra and petticoat set. Paper clothing boutiques were set up in department stores such as Abraham & Straus and I. Magnin. Various bonded paper materials were retailed under names such as Kendall's non-woven rayon "Webril"; "Ree-May", a spunbond polyester by DuPont; and "Kaycel", a fire-resistant 93% cellulose 7% nylon blend by Kimberly-Stevens that, it was claimed, could be washed and ironed up to 20 times. In the trade, these textiles were not called "paper", but were instead described as "non-wovens" although they were marketed and widely described as paper. The process of producing the 1950s-60s paper dress materials was a bindng technique similar to felting. In the spring of 1967, paper yardage became available for home-dressmaking, with sewists advised to use Butterick's, McCall's or Vogue Couturier dressmaking patterns with deep armholes.

Between April and October 1967, the Expo 67 in Montreal featured paper clothing in the Pulp and Paper Pavilion. In June 1967 Mademoiselle ran a cover story, "The Big Paper Craze", highlighting some of the innovative and alternative takes on paper fashion, including a "smart smock" made from knitted paper yarn, brimmed hats made of paper, bikinis and bedroom slippers. One dress was described as "poly-plastic on Dura-Weve paper" (sic) that could be wiped down and ironed for repeated wear. One of the most unusual paper dresses of the decade was designed for the Paraphernalia boutique, founded in New York in 1965, whose radical designs by Betsey Johnson, Diana Dew and others, were among the few American challengers to innovative London young fashion design. The design was made from soft blotting paper which had been impregnated with seeds that immediately flowered when the dress was moistened. As with many of Paraphernalia's clothes, it was intended to be worn once and then thrown away.

In January 1968 the Museum of Contemporary Crafts in Manhattan presented an exhibition titled "Made With Paper" which showcased clothing made from paper, including several dresses, hats, shirts, and a shaggy paper coat by Bonnie Cashin, who would launch a line that same year titled "Paper Route to Fashion". Cashin had been interested in the possibilities of paper since the early 1950s, when she made herself bags from it. Pierre Cardin designed a paper jacket for a concert pianist in France, who ceremonially cut off the sleeves before giving their performance. Other couturiers such as Hubert de Givenchy and Paco Rabanne made paper designs too. For a 1967 fund-raising dinner for the Police Athletic League in New York, attendees commissioned luxurious paper dresses from American couturiers such as Ferdinando Sarmi and Bill Blass, whose cheetah-print brown paper dress had cuffs of expensive sable fur. Even the Duchess of Windsor, a fixture on Best-Dressed lists, wore a paper dress, making paper clothing a truly democratic fashion that could be worn by anyone at any social level.

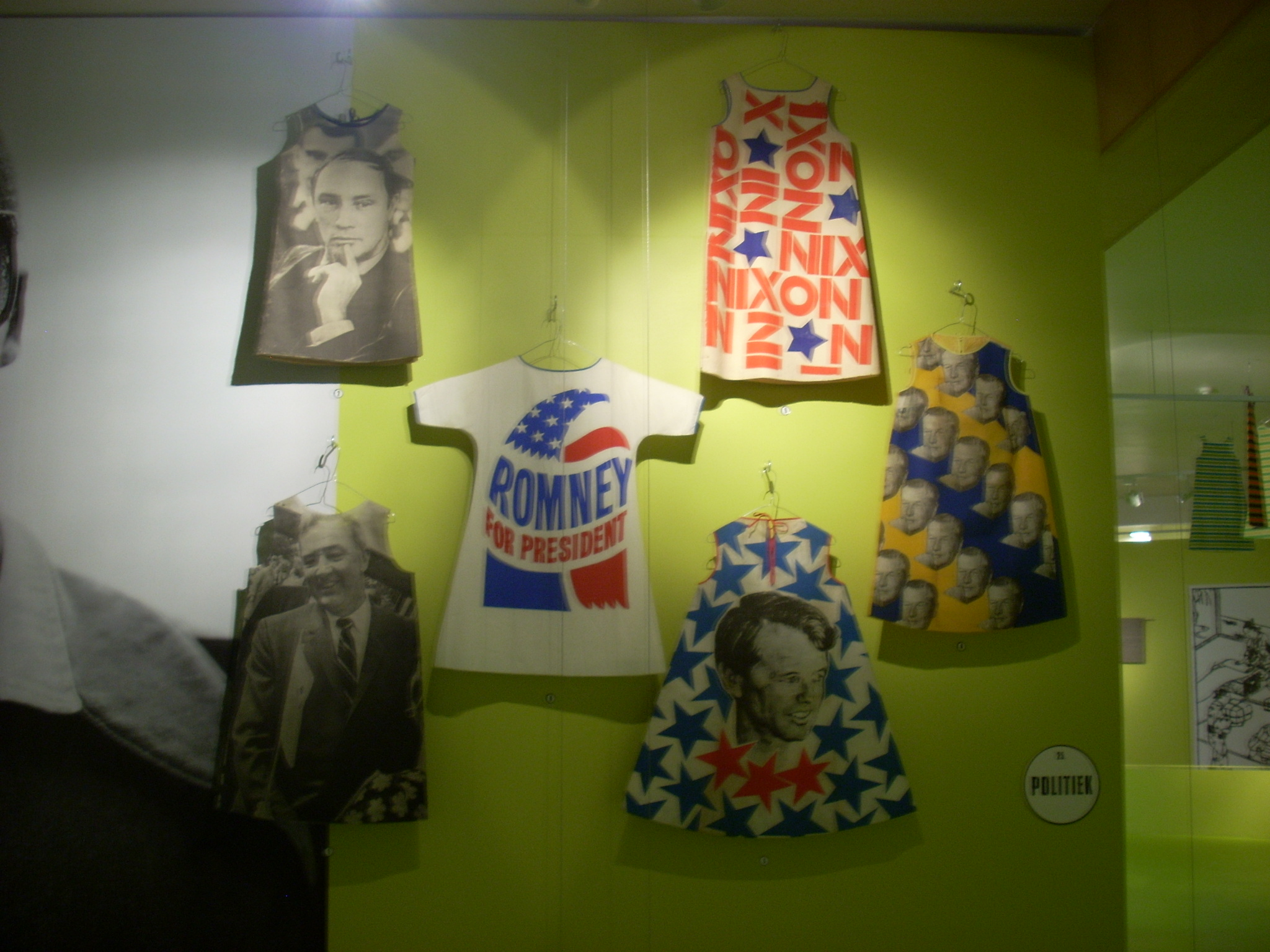
Six paper dresses made for presidential election campaigns in 1968 including Trudeau, Nixon, Romney, and Kennedy. ATOPOS

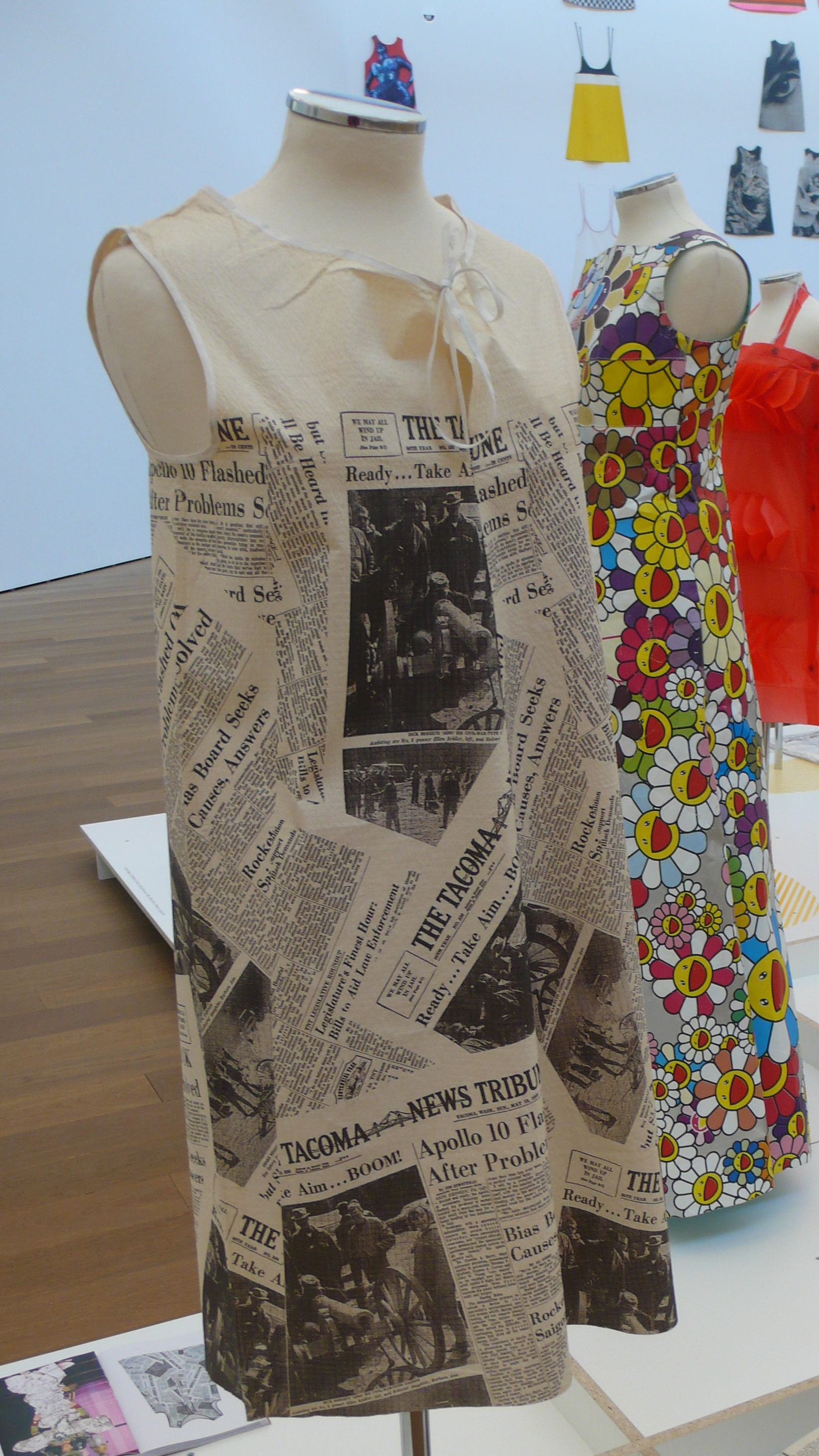
1969 commemorative paper dress: Launch of Apollo 10. ATOPOS

Paper dresses became a political tool in 1968 to accompany presidential campaigns such as those of Nixon, Romney, and Kennedy, as well as Nelson Rockefeller and Canada's Pierre Trudeau. While custom-printed T-shirts offered a more durable alternative, paper dresses offered an even more affordable and accessible way of advertising and expressing support. Companies such as Butterfinger, Green Giant, Viking Carpets and Owens Corning offered paper dress giveaways to encourage customers to buy their merchandise. For one or two wrappers or box tops plus a dollar or two, customers could acquire a dress from Lifebuoy, Breck, or Pillsbury, sometimes with an additional matching hat. TIME sent a Valentine's Day themed paper dress to their subscribers, the white dress printed with an Op-Art rendering of the TIME logo and packed in a red box with a note reading: “For your ValenTIME for every week in homes like yours across the country, some six million women slip into a little black-and-white print that’s just their taste and interests: TIME, the weekly news magazine.” Some dresses were printed to commemorate historical events, such as one printed with newspaper front pages about the Apollo 10 launch in May 1969.

By 1969, however, the novelty of paper dresses was quickly wearing off as they were not very comfortable, their flat shift-dress shapes felt repetitive and lacked variety, and their fire- and water-proofing was unreliable. Increasing awareness of the environmental concerns of indiscriminate disposal and throw-away consumerism also contributed towards the dropping off of interest in paper fashion. However, the idea of paper clothing endured on a more practical level, in the form of single-wear disposable sleepwear and underwear for traveling, and clothing for healthcare and medical environments. The paper fashion fad effectively foreshadowed early 21st-century fast fashion.

== Paper fashion (1970-1999) ==
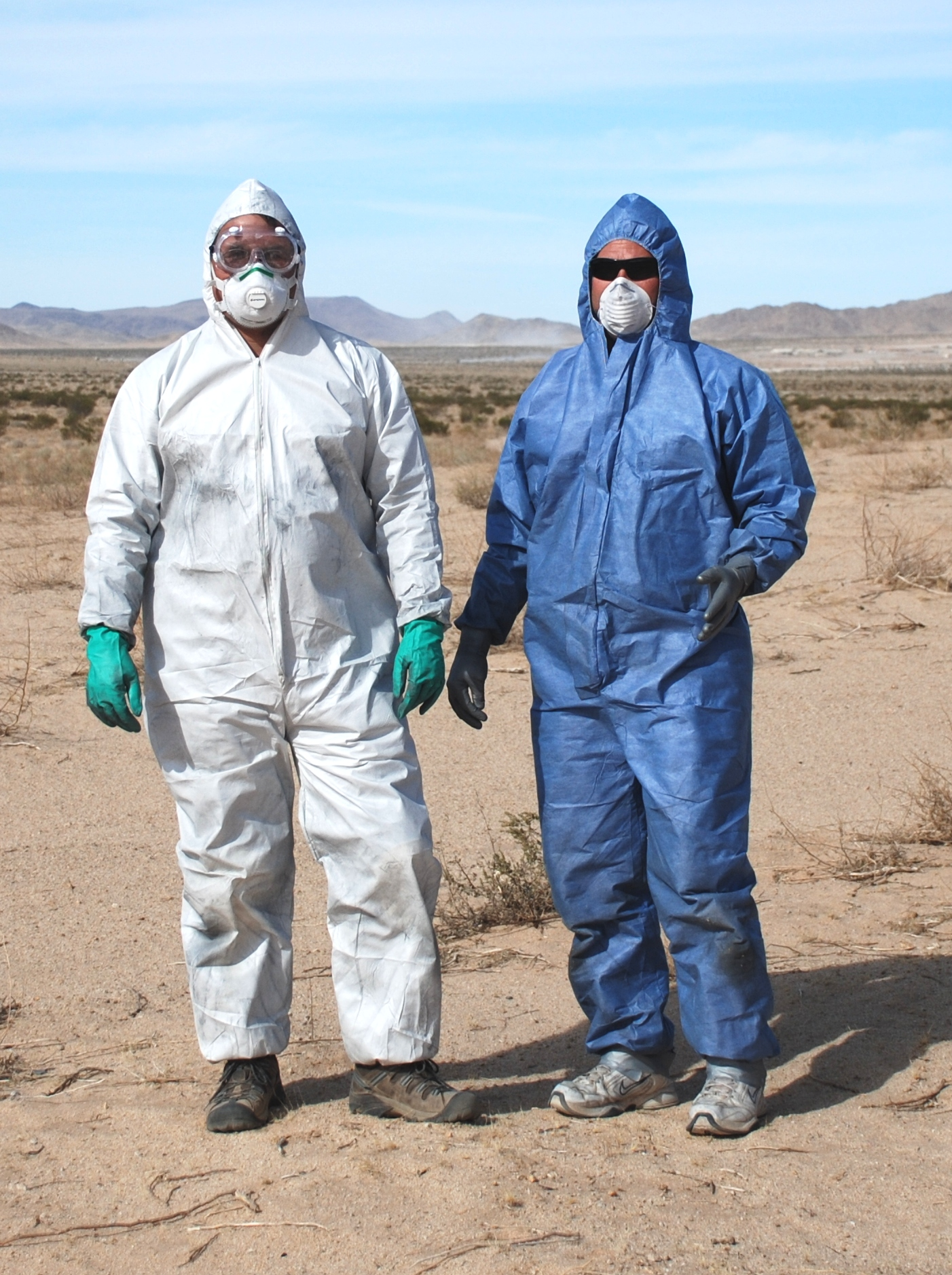
Protective Tyvek suits

Although paper dresses had fallen out of style, non-woven paper-like materials such as Tyvek continued to inspire designers and manufacturers. For a mainstream audience, however, paper clothing was mainly marketed as a functional option for traveling, for convenience, and for disposable garments for work and healthcare environments, such as hospital gowns, scrubs, and coveralls. Paper was seldom seen in mainstream fashion garments in the 1970s and 1980s. One exception, seen from the late 1980s onwards, is washable Tyvek as a fabric for promotional jackets and other garments. In China in the 1980s and 1990s, paper clothing enjoyed a brief revival, but the fad quickly cooled down without paper garments re-entering daily life.

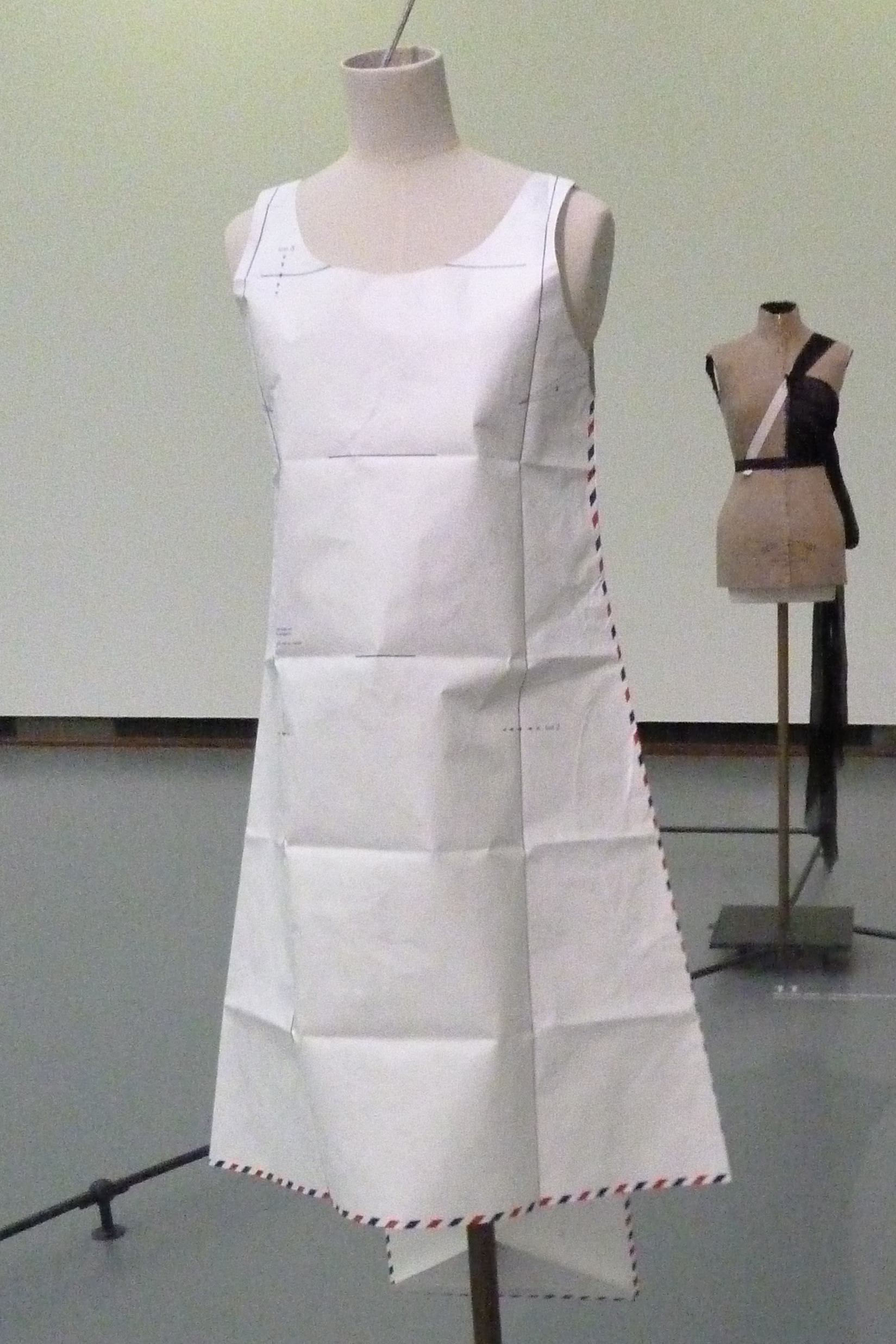
Hussein Chalayan Airmail Dress, designed 1993

The revival of paper as a fashion fabric came in the 1990s, when designers began looking anew at using non-woven fabric. This also formed part of a revival of interest in futurism while on the edge of the new millennium. Established designers such as Vivienne Tam, Helmut Lang, or Yeohlee Teng occasionally incorporated paper or paper-substitutes into their work. For a Spring-Summer 1992 ready-to-wear collection for Comme des Garçons, Rei Kawakubo designed dresses made from polyester-rayon paper material intricately cut in traditional Japanese patterns to create an all-over lace texture. Other looks in the same collection looked more like the paper dress patterns used to make garments, than they did traditional garments. For Autumn-Winter 1998 Miuccia Prada designed a two-piece white dress with a pleated paper skirt applied with panels of thin plastic, and Junya Watanabe offered tunics made from non-woven cloth in Spring-Summer 1996. One of the designers most associated with updated paper fashion in the 1990s was the British-based Cypriot designer Hussein Chalayan. In 1993, the same year that he graduated from Central Saint Martins, Chalayan created his "Airmail Dress" based upon air-mail envelopes that fold out into letter-paper. The dress itself can be folded into an incorporated envelope and mailed, with the idea that the sender can write or draw over the largely blank paper surface before sending it to the recipient to unfold and wear. The Airmail dress was later reissued in limited editions, and in 2001, The Observer held a competition to give away ten Airmail Dresses. The Tyvek material used for the mailers inspired Chalayan to design an entire collection of "paper" polyethylene fashion in 1995, some of which featured air-mail stripes such as the jacket worn by Björk on the cover of her album, Post.

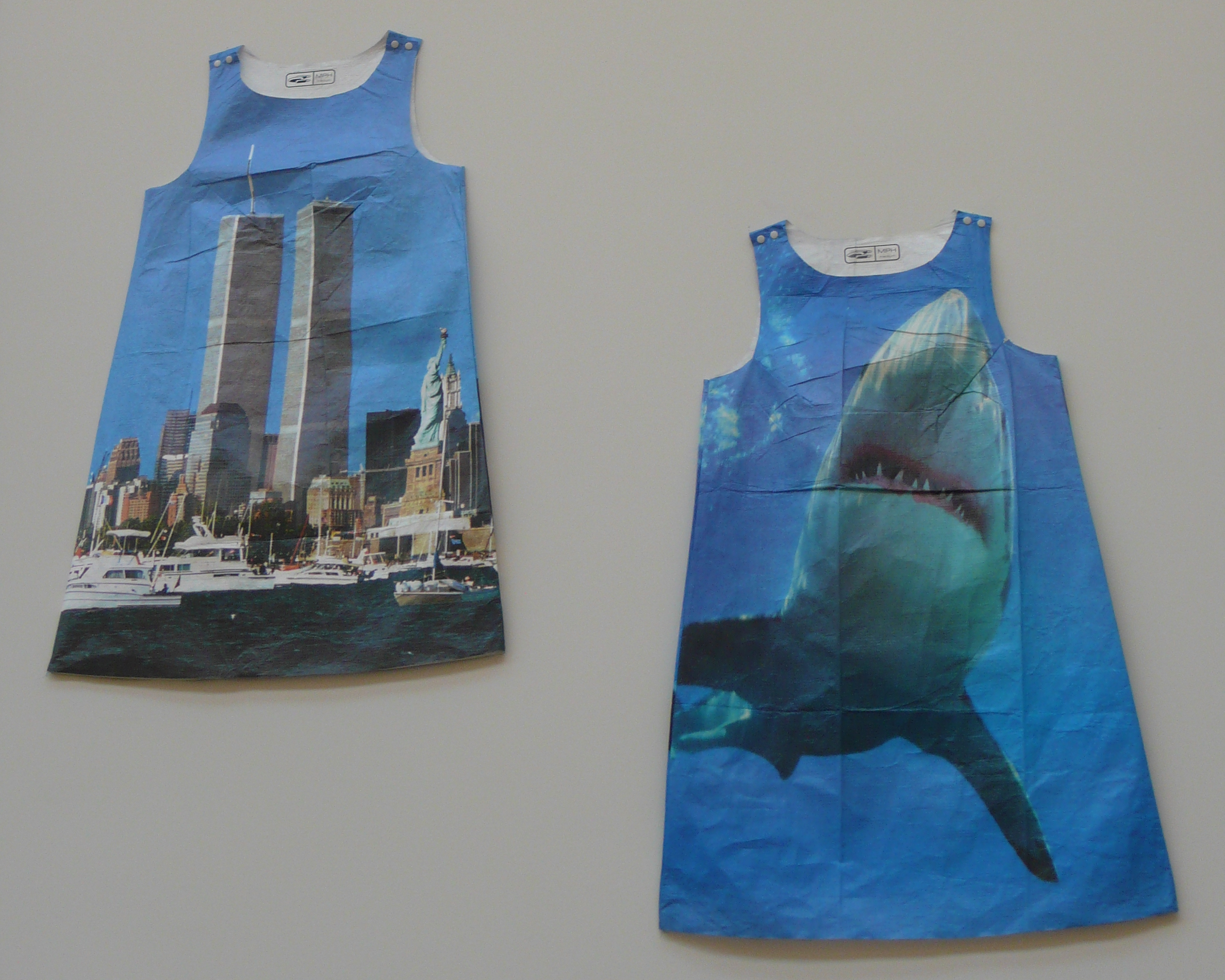
1999 "Twin Towers" and "Killer Shark" paper dresses by Sarah Caplan. ATOPOS

Another designer who became known for her paper fashion was artist and graphic designer Sarah Caplan whose 1999 designs were intended to recreate the 1960s fashion for the new millennium. Her offset-printed Tyvek designs included one printed with the Twin Towers, and another featuring a shark.

In 1996 the artist James Rosenquist was approached by Hugo Boss to ask whether they could replicate his trademark 1966 paper suit for charity. The original suit, created in 1966 by the tailor Horst using brown paper supplied by Kleenex had been commissioned by Rosenquist after he became tired of renting formalwear. Although the suit eventually fell apart a few months later after being worn multiple times and dyed black, it became something that Rosenquist was particularly known for. The Hugo Boss suits were created in March 1998 in a limited edition of 100 to accompany an exhibition at the Deutsche Guggenheim. One of the Rosenquist replica suits was subsequently worn by John Karastamatis, a publicity agent for Mirvish Productions, to the 2000 Toronto premiere of Mirvish's live action The Lion King, where the seat of the trousers ripped open in front of the cameras, and had to be repaired with masking tape.

== Paper fashion in the 21st century ==
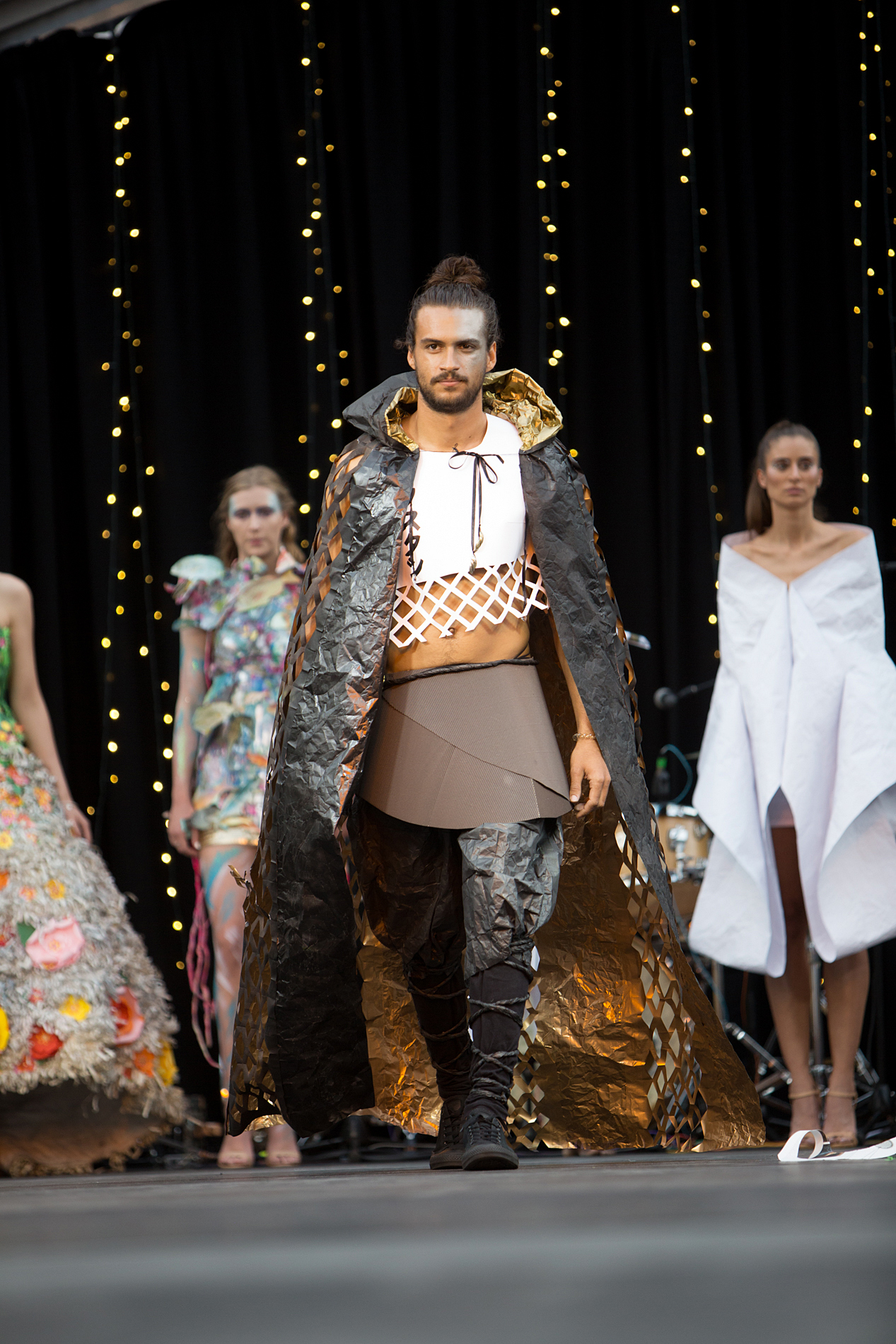
One-off paper fashion show held at King George Square, Brisbane, November 2017

In the early 21st century paper fashion has largely been limited to one-off events, novelty fashion shows, or competitions. Olivia Horsfall Turner has suggested that the true 21st-century legacy of the 1960s paper fashion fad is fast fashion, where, due to globalization, fabric clothing can be manufactured and retailed so inexpensively that consumers throw it away rather than launder it. Where paper clothing exists in the 21st-century mainstream, it is mainly in medical, safety- and hygiene-conscious environments, such as disposable hospital gowns.

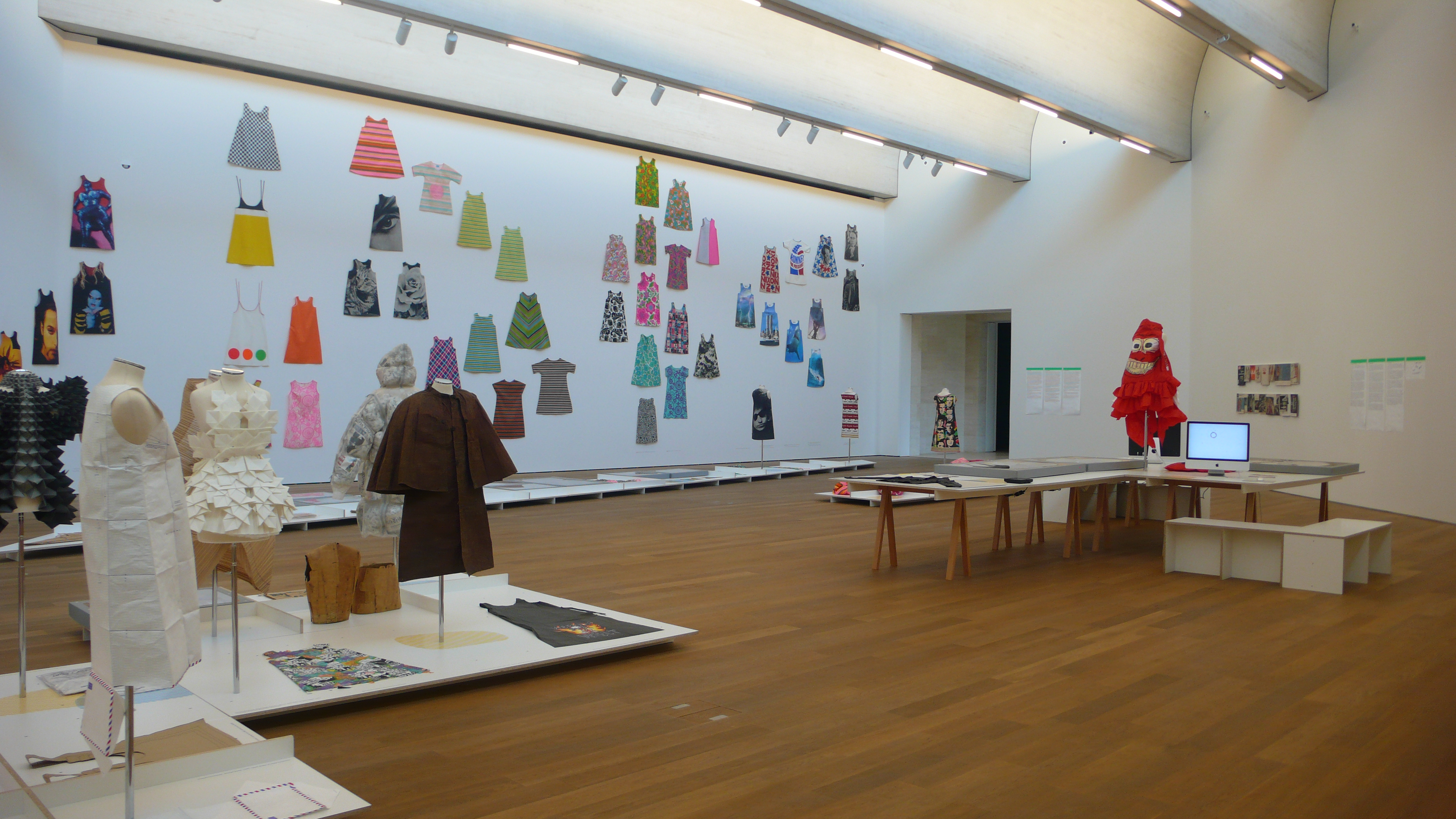
The ATOPOS paper fashion collection as exhibited in MUDAM, 2007

In 2005, ATOPOS CVC, based in Athens, started the RRRIPP!! collection of paper dresses and garments. ATOPOS is a non-profit organization founded in 2003 by Vassilis Zidianakis and Stamos Fafalios that focuses on the human body and its presentation and adornment. The ATOPOS collection numbers over 500 examples of paper fashion from early Japanese artefacts to contemporary designer pieces, though the majority of the collection is from 1966 to 1969. Alongside worn and wearable pieces, including paper vests worn by French and Belgian prisoners of war during World War II and 18th-century kamiko are unique artworks such as Isabelle de Borchgrave's paper replica of a Christian Dior suit and commissions by contemporary designers such as Rick Owens and Demna Gvasalia. The ATOPOS collection formed the basis for an internationally traveling exhibition in the late 2000s and early 2010s which was seen at many museums including the Benaki Museum, MUDAM (Luxembourg), and ModeMuseum Antwerpen. The collection has also acquired examples of paper fashion from catwalk presentations, including a 2004 ensemble in brown paper from AF Vandevorst's Spring-Summer collection, nine work-in-progress pieces by Issey Miyake made from paper for the exhibition XXIst Century Man held at 21_21 Design Sight in Tokyo, and work by the Japanese-Brazilian designer Jum Nakao, whose 2004 fashion presentation in São Paulo of intricately laser cut, embossed and constructed white paper gowns notoriously ended with the models ripping the garments off their bodies.

Paper is a popular novelty theme for fashion shows or competitions, both one-off and regular events. In Mollerussa, Spain, an annual paper-dressmaking contest has been run every December since 1963, and the city founded a museum in 2009 to showcase the winning designs, the Museu Vestitis de Paper Mollerussa. The Museu Vestitis holds the Guinness World Record for the largest paper dress display as of October 2018. The rules of the competition are that every design must be sewn, with no glue or adhesion used unless for trimmings and ornament, although the surface of the paper is permitted to be painted or sprayed. Another Spanish paper dressmaking contest, founded in the late 1950s, is held each September in Güeñes, Basque County as part of the annual La Cruz de Güeñes festival. Dresses from both the Güeñes and Mollerussa contests have been exhibited at the Escuela Museo de Origami in Zaragoza, Europe's only museum dedicated to origami and located in the same city as Europe's largest paper mill. Elsewhere, Denver has held the Paper Fashion Show fashion contest each spring since 2004 to celebrate and showcase local Colorado design talent.
