= List of paper products =

A paper product is a product made from paper.

== Art and culture ==
- Paper clothing
- Paper plane
- Paper yarn
- Papier-mâché
- Quilling
- Wallpaper

== Cleaning ==
- Facial tissue
- Toilet paper
- Paper towel

== Culinary ==
- Coffee filter
- Cupcake liner
- Food packaging
  - Beverage carton
  - Tea bag
- Paper cup
- Paper napkin
- Paper plate

== Information storage ==
- Book
- File folder
- Notebook
- Photographic paper
- Punched card

== Industry and science ==
- Electrical insulation paper a.k.a. fishpaper
- Filter paper
- Litmus paper
- Paper chromatography
- Sandpaper a.k.a. glasspaper
- Universal indicator

== Packaging and Stationery ==
- Envelope
- File folder
- Corrugated box
- Letterhead
- Notebook a.k.a. writing pad, legal pad, memo pad, diary, journal
- Paper bag
- Paper string
- Personal organizer
- Post card
- Sticky note
- Wrapping paper

== Store of value ==
- Bank note
- Cheque
- Paper money
- Security paper
- Ticket
- Voucher

== Text ==
- Book
- Newspaper
- Magazine
- Poster
- Pamphlet
- Map
- Sign
- Label
- Billboard

== See also ==
- Paper engineering
