= Hanzon =

Hanzon is a surname. Notable people with the surname include:

- Lonnie Hanzon (born 1959), American artist
- Thomas Hanzon (born 1962), Swedish actor

== See also ==
- Hanlon
- Hanson (surname)
