= John Aubrey =

English writer and antiquarian (1626–1697)

John Aubrey FRS
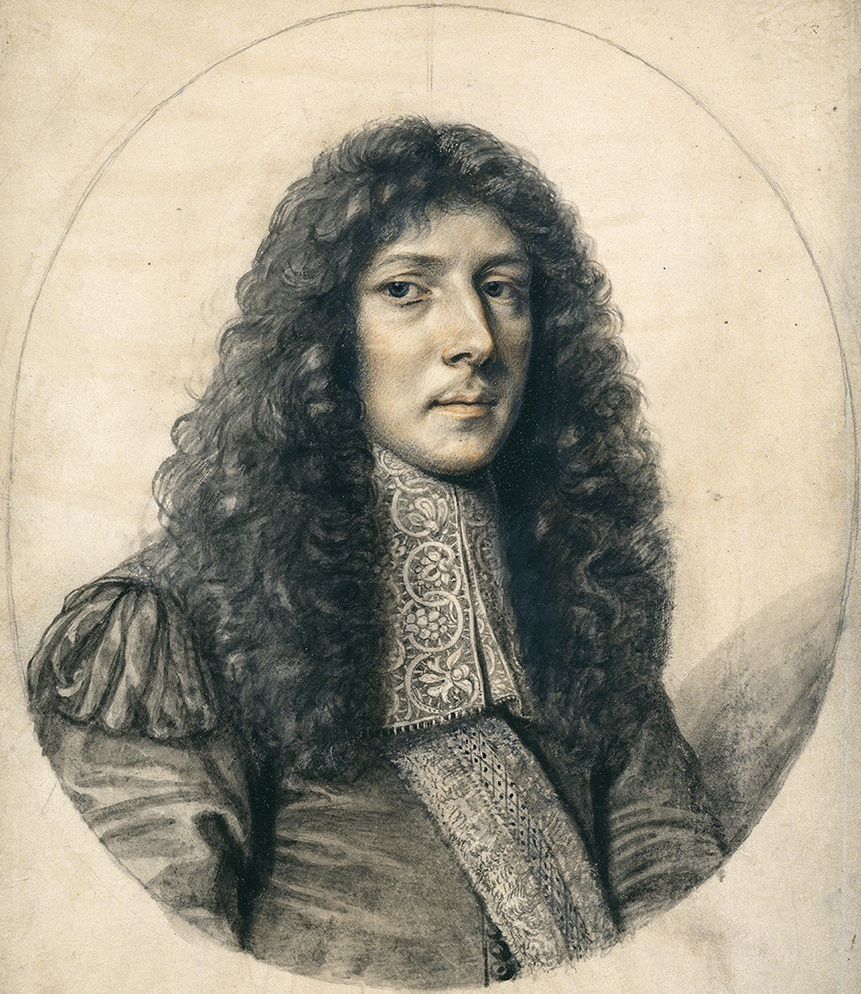
- Born: 12 March 1626; Kington St Michael, Wiltshire, England
- Died: 7 June 1697 (aged 71)
- Resting place: St Mary Magdalen, Oxford; 51.754620°N 1.258826°W
- Education: Trinity College, Oxford
- Occupations: Author; antiquarian; biographer

John Aubrey FRS (12 March 1626 – 7 June 1697) was an English antiquary, natural philosopher and writer. He was a pioneer archaeologist who recorded numerous megalithic and other field monuments in southern England. He systematically examined the Avebury henge monument. The Aubrey holes at Stonehenge are named after him, although there is doubt as to whether the holes that he observed are those that bear his name. He was also a pioneer folklorist, collecting together a miscellany of material on customs, traditions and beliefs under the title "Remaines of Gentilisme and Judaisme". He set out to compile county histories of both Wiltshire and Surrey, although both projects remained unfinished. His "Interpretation of Villare Anglicanum" (also unfinished) was the first attempt to compile a full-length study of English place-names. He had wider interests in applied mathematics and astronomy, and was friendly with many of the greatest scientists of the day.

Aubrey was the author of Brief Lives, a collection of short biographical pieces. For much of the 19th and 20th centuries, thanks largely to the popularity of Brief Lives, Aubrey was regarded as little more than an entertaining but quirky, eccentric and credulous gossip. Only in the 1970s did the full breadth and innovation of his scholarship begin to be more widely appreciated. He published little in his lifetime, and many of his most important manuscripts (for the most part preserved in the Bodleian Library) remain unpublished, or published only in partial form.

== Early life ==
Aubrey was born at Easton Piers or Percy (now Easton Piercy), near Kington St Michael, Wiltshire, to a long-established and affluent gentry family with roots in the Welsh Marches. His maternal grandfather, Isaac Lyte, lived at Lytes Cary Manor, Somerset, now owned by the National Trust. Richard Aubrey, his father, owned lands in Wiltshire and Herefordshire. For many years an only child, he was educated at home with a private tutor, he was "melancholy" in his solitude. His father was not intellectual, preferring field sports (hunting) to learning. Aubrey read such books as came his way, including Bacon's Essays, and studied geometry in secret.

Aubrey was educated at the Malmesbury grammar school under Robert Latimer. (Latimer had numbered the philosopher Thomas Hobbes among his earlier pupils, and Aubrey first met Hobbes, whose biography he would later write, at Latimer's house.) He then studied at the grammar school at Blandford Forum, Dorset.

Aubrey entered Trinity College, Oxford, in 1642, but his studies were interrupted by the English Civil War. His earliest antiquarian work dates from this period in Oxford. In 1646 he became a student of the Middle Temple. He spent a pleasant time at Trinity in 1647, making friends among his Oxford contemporaries, and collecting books. He spent much of his time in the country.

In 1649, Aubrey discovered the megalithic remains at Avebury, which he later mapped and discussed in his important antiquarian work Monumenta Britannica. He was to show Avebury to Charles II at the King's request in 1663. His father died in 1652, leaving Aubrey large estates, but with them some complicated debts.

== Career ==
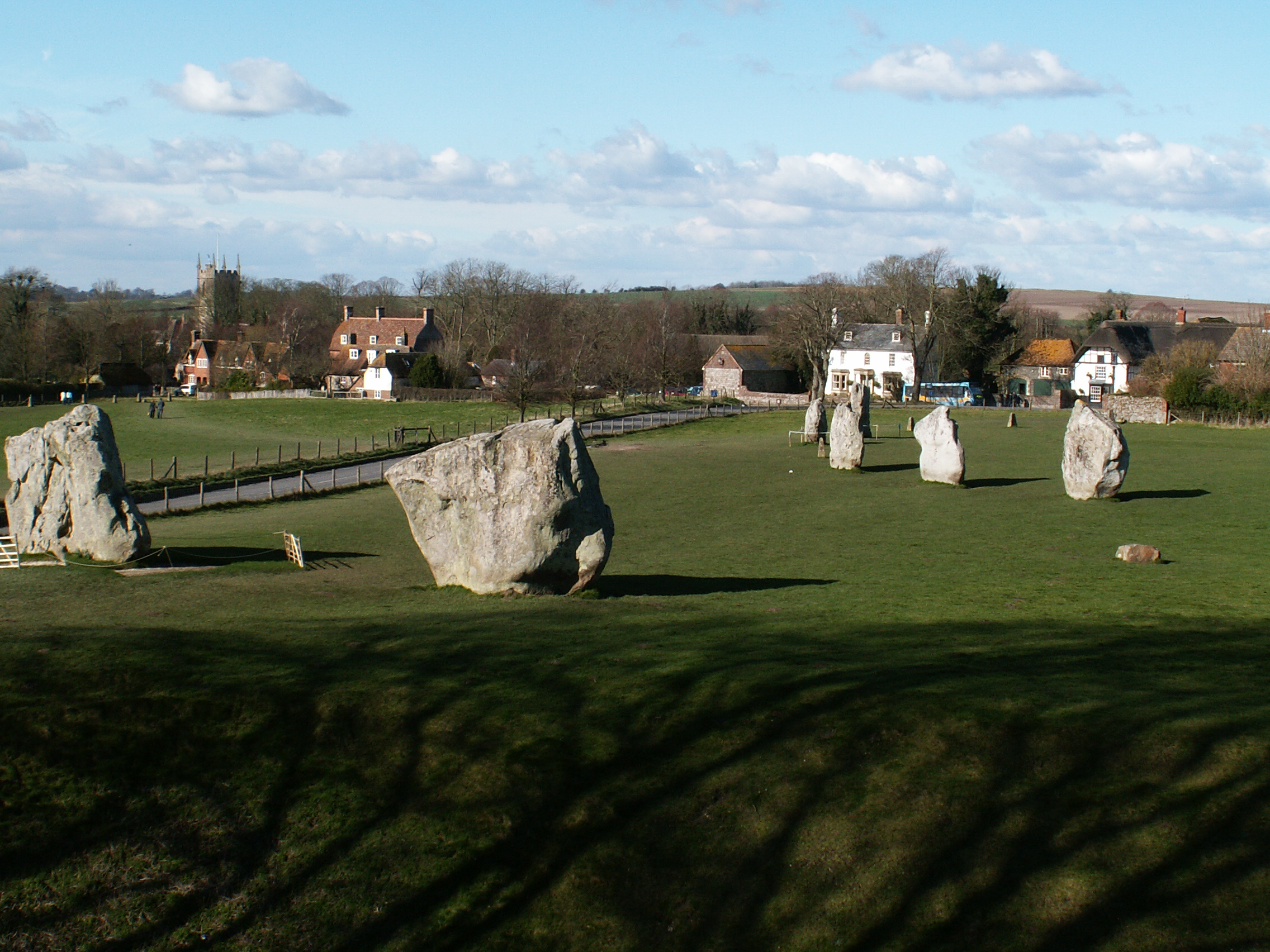
Part of the southern inner ring at Avebury

Aubrey said his memory was "not tenacious" by 17th-century standards but from the early 1640s he kept thorough (if haphazard) notes of observations in natural philosophy, his friends' ideas, and antiquities. He began to write "Lives" of scientists in the 1650s.

In 1659, Aubrey was recruited to contribute to a collaborative county history of Wiltshire, leading to his unfinished collections on the antiquities and the natural history of the county. His erstwhile friend and fellow-antiquary Anthony Wood predicted that he would one day break his neck while running downstairs in haste to interview some retreating guest or other. Aubrey was an apolitical Royalist, who enjoyed the innovations characteristic of the Interregnum period while deploring the rupture in traditions and the destruction of ancient buildings brought about by civil war and religious change. He drank the King's health in Interregnum Herefordshire, but with equal enthusiasm attended meetings in London of the republican Rota Club.

In 1663, Aubrey became a member of the Royal Society. He lost estate after estate due to lawsuits, until 1670 when he parted with his last piece of property and ancestral home, Easton Piers. By this time he was officially bankrupt. From this time he was dependent on the hospitality of his numerous friends; in particular, Sir James Long, 2nd Baronet, and his wife Lady Dorothy of Draycot House, Wiltshire.

In 1667, Aubrey had made the acquaintance of Anthony Wood at Oxford, and when Wood began to gather materials for his Athenae Oxonienses, Aubrey offered to collect information for him. From time to time he forwarded memoranda in a uniquely casual, epistolary style, and in 1680 he began to promise the work Minutes for Lives, which Wood was to use at his discretion.

== Death ==
Aubrey died of an apoplexy while travelling, in June 1697, aged 71, and was buried in the churchyard of St Mary Magdalen, Oxford.

== Biographical methods ==
Aubrey approached the work of the biographer much as his contemporary scientists had begun to approach the work of empirical research by the assembly of vast museums and small collection cabinets. Collating as much information as he could, he left the task of verification largely to Wood, and thereafter to posterity. As a hanger-on in great houses, he had little time and little inclination for systematic work, and he wrote the "Lives" in the early morning while his hosts were sleeping off the effects of the night before. These texts were, as Aubrey entitled them, Schediasmata, "pieces written extempore, on the spur of the moment". Time after time, he leaves marks of omission in the form of dashes and ellipses for dates and facts, inserting fresh information whenever it is presented to him. The margins of his notebooks are dotted with notes-to-self, most frequently the Latin "quaere". This exhortation, to "go and find out" is often followed. In his life of Thomas Harcourt, Aubrey notes that one Roydon, a brewer living in Southwark, was reputed to be in possession of Harcourt's petrified kidney: "I have seen it", he writes approvingly; "he much values it".

Aubrey himself valued the evidence of his own eyes above all, and he took great pains to ensure that, where possible, he noted not only the final resting places of people, but also of their portraits and papers. Though his work has frequently been accused of inaccuracy, this charge is misguided. In most cases, Aubrey simply wrote what he had seen, or heard. When transcribing hearsay, he displays a careful approach to the ascription of sources. For example, in his life of Thomas Chaloner (who, Aubrey notes, was himself fond of spreading rumours in the concourse of Westminster Hall, coming back after lunch to find them changed), he recorded an inaccurate and bawdy anecdote about Chaloner's death, but subsequently found it to be in fact about James Chaloner. Aubrey let the initial story stand in his text, while highlighting the error in a marginal note.

== Works ==
=== Brief Lives ===
In 1680, Aubrey began work on his collection of biographical sketches, which he entitled "Schediasmata: Brief Lives". He presented them to Anthony Wood in 1681 but continued to work on them until 1693, when he deposited his manuscripts (in three folio volumes) in the Ashmolean Museum: they are now in the Bodleian Library, as MSS Aubrey 6–8.

As private, manuscript texts, the "Lives" were able to contain the richly controversial material which is their chief interest today, and Aubrey's chief contribution to the formation of modern biographical writing. When he allowed Anthony Wood to use the texts, however, he entered the caveat that much of the content of the Lives was "not fitt to be let flie abroad" while the subjects and the author were still living.

Aubrey's relationship with Wood was to become increasingly fraught. Aubrey asked Wood to be "my index expurgatorius": a reference to the Church's list of banned books, which Wood seems to have taken not as a warning, but as a licence to simply extract pages of notes to paste into his own proofs. In 1692, Aubrey complained bitterly that Wood had mutilated forty pages of his manuscript, perhaps for fear of a libel case. Wood was eventually prosecuted for insinuations against the judicial integrity of the school of Clarendon. One of the two statements called in question was founded on information provided by Aubrey and this may explain the estrangement between the two antiquaries and the ungrateful account that Wood gives of Aubrey's character. It is now famous: "a shiftless person, roving and magotie-headed, and sometimes little better than crased. And being exceedingly credulous, would stuff his many letters sent to A. W. with folliries and misinformations, which would sometimes guid him into the paths of errour".

A large part of the "Lives" was published in 1813 as Letters Written by Eminent Persons in the Seventeenth and Eighteenth Centuries. A near-complete transcript, Brief Lives, Chiefly of Contemporaries, Set Down by John Aubrey, Between the Years 1669 and 1696, was edited for the Clarendon Press in 1898 by the Rev. Andrew Clark. This remained the standard edition for scholarly use for many years, but (from a modern perspective) was flawed by the number of excisions Clark had made in the interests of "decency". In the 20th century, a number of more popular editions appeared, which often included the expurgated passages, but were in other respects far more selective: these included versions edited by John Collier (under the title The Scandal and Credulities of John Aubrey; 1931), Anthony Powell (1949), Oliver Lawson Dick (1949), Richard Barber (1975), and John Buchanan-Brown (2000; with an introduction by Michael Hunter). The most scholarly and complete edition, and now the standard edition for reference purposes, is Kate Bennett (ed.), Brief Lives with An Apparatus for the Lives of our English Mathematical Writers (2 volumes, Oxford, 2015), which was described on publication by Michael Hunter as "the edition we have been waiting for".

The "Lives" present a number of difficult editorial problems as to what should be included or excluded, and how best to present the material. A controversial book for its time, "Lives" bluntly mocked the scandalous lives of eminent figures. For instance, Aubrey wrote of John Milton: "His complexion exceeding faire—he was so faire that they called him the Lady of Christ's College." He wrote of William Butler: "The Dr. lying at the Savoy in London, next the water side where was a balcony look't into the Thames, a patient came to him that was grievously tormented with an ague. The Dr. orders a boat to be in readiness under his window, and discoursed with the patient (a gent) in the balcony, when on a signal given, 2 or 3 lusty fellows came behind the gent, and threw him a matter of 20 feet into the Thames. This surprise absolutely cured him." Of Ben Jonson: "He lies buried in the north aisle in the path of square stone … with this inscription only on him, in a pavement square of blue marble about 14" square; O RARE BEN JONSON." Of William Shakespeare: "His comedies will remain wit as long as the English tongue is understood, for that he handles mores hominum [the ways of mankind]. Now our present writers reflect so much on particular persons and coxcombeities that twenty years hence they will not be understood." Aubrey also wrote of Francis Bacon that "he was a Pederast."

At somewhat greater length, Aubrey also wrote a life of the philosopher Thomas Hobbes (author of Leviathan), entitled "The Life of Mr Thomas Hobbes of Malmesbury": this is now Bodleian MS Aubrey 9. It is often grouped with the Brief Lives, but is really a separate and self-contained work. It served as the basis for Richard Blackburne's Latin biography, Vitae Hobbianae auctarium, published in 1681. The life of Hobbes was included in Clark's 1898 edition of Brief Lives, but not in Bennett's 2015 edition.

=== Monumenta Britannica ===
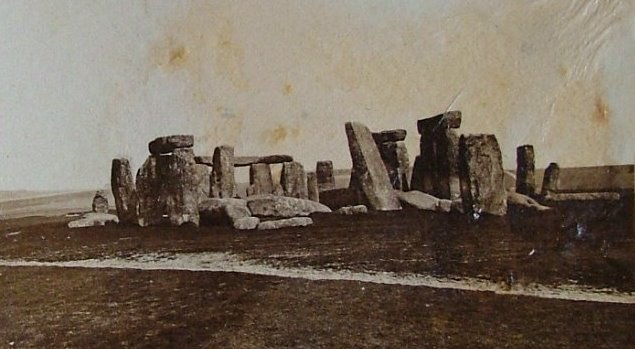
An early photograph of Stonehenge taken July 1877

The Monumenta Britannica was Aubrey's principal collection of archaeological material, written over some thirty years between about 1663 and 1693. It falls into four parts: (1) "Templa Druidum", a discussion of supposed "druidic" temples, notably Avebury and Stonehenge; (2) "Chorographia Antiquaria", a survey of other early urban and military sites, including Roman towns, "camps" (hillforts), and castles; (3) a review of other archaeological remains, including sepulchral monuments, roads, coins and urns; and (4) a series of more analytical pieces, including four exercises attempting to chart the chronological stylistic evolution of handwriting, medieval architecture, costume, and shield-shapes. Of these last, the essay on architecture, "Chronologia Architectonica", written in 1671, was the most detailed, and (although in its unpublished state it remained little known) is now regarded as a highly perceptive milestone in the development of architectural history.

The manuscript of Monumenta Britannica is now Bodleian MSS Top.Gen.c.24 and 25. An edition of the first three parts (reproduced, following unorthodox editing principles, partly in facsimile, and partly in printed transcript) was published by John Fowles and Rodney Legg in two volumes in 1980–82. This edition has, however, been criticised for doing Aubrey "less than justice" on various grounds: for a failure to consolidate what were essentially drafts and working notes into a coherent whole, for silent omissions and rearrangements, for inadequate and occasionally inaccurate annotation, and for the omission of the important fourth part of the work.

=== Wiltshire ===
Aubrey began work on compiling material for a natural historical and antiquarian study of Wiltshire in 1656. Independently, in 1659, a self-appointed committee of Wiltshire gentry determined that a county history should be produced on the model of William Dugdale's Antiquities of Warwickshire. It was agreed that Aubrey would deal with the northern division of the county.

Aubrey chose to divide the work into two separate projects, on the antiquities and the natural history of the county respectively. The work on the antiquities (which he entitled Hypomnemata Antiquaria) was closely modelled on Dugdale, and was largely finished by 1671: Aubrey deposited his draft in the Ashmolean Museum in two manuscript volumes. Unfortunately, one of these was withdrawn by his brother in 1703 and subsequently lost. He then turned to the county's natural history. Some of his interim observations were read to the Royal Society in 1668 and 1675–6. In 1685 Aubrey recast the work, now modelling it on Robert Plot's Natural History of Oxford-shire (published in 1677); and it was effectively finished by 1690–91, when he transcribed a fair copy. Shortly afterwards the Royal Society commissioned another transcript, at a cost of £7. In 1693 Aubrey asked his brother William Aubrey and Thomas Tanner to bring the project to completion, but despite their best intentions they failed to do so.

The manuscript of the Naturall Historie is now Bodleian MSS Aubrey 1 and 2. The Royal Society's copy, which includes material (mainly on supernatural phenomena) that Aubrey afterwards removed from his own manuscript, is now Royal Society MS 92. The surviving manuscript of the Antiquities is now Bodleian MS Aubrey 3. A highly selective edition of the Naturall Historie was published by John Britton in 1847 for the Wiltshire Topographical Society. The Antiquities were published (again, with certain omissions) by John Edward Jackson in 1862 as Wiltshire: the Topographical Collections of John Aubrey.

==== Editions ====
- Jackson, John Edward, ed. (1862). Wiltshire: The Topographical Collections of John Aubrey, F.R.S., A.D. 1659–70, with Illustrations. Devizes: Wiltshire Archaeological and Natural History Society.

=== Perambulation of Surrey ===
In 1673, the royal cosmographer and cartographer John Ogilby, planning a national atlas and chorography of Britain, licensed Aubrey to undertake a survey of Surrey. Aubrey carried out the work, but in the event Ogilby's project was curtailed, and he did not use the material. Aubrey, however, continued to add to his manuscript until 1692.

The manuscript is now Bodleian MS Aubrey 4. In a much-revised form (with both additions and excisions) it was published by Richard Rawlinson as the Natural History and Antiquities of Surrey in five volumes in 1718–19.

=== Remaines of Gentilisme and Judaisme ===
The Remaines of Gentilisme and Judaisme was Aubrey's collection of material on customs, traditions, ceremonies, beliefs, old wives' tales and rhymes—or what today would be termed folklore. It was compiled over many years, but written up between 1687 and 1689.

The manuscript came into the hands of White Kennett, and as a result it is not with Aubrey's other collections in the Bodleian: it is in the British Library, as Lansdowne MS 231. An edition was published by James Britten for the Folklore Society in 1881. It was more satisfactorily re-edited in 1972 by John Buchanan-Brown.

=== Interpretation of Villare Anglicanum ===
Aubrey's Interpretation of Villare Anglicanum (its preface dated 31 October 1687) was the first attempt to devote a work entirely to the subject of English place-names. It is, however, unfinished (or, as Gillian Fellows-Jensen observes, "hardly begun"). Aubrey compiled a list of some 5,000 place-names, but managed to provide derivations for only a relatively small proportion of them: many are correct, but some are wildly wrong. The manuscript is now Bodleian MS Aubrey 5.

=== Miscellanies ===
The only work published by Aubrey in his lifetime was his Miscellanies (1696; reprinted with additions in 1721), a collection of 21 short chapters on the theme of "hermetick philosophy" (i.e. supernatural phenomena and the occult), including "Omens", "Prophesies", "Transportation in the Air", "Converse with Angels and Spirits", "Second-Sighted Persons", etc. Its contents mainly comprised documented reports of supernatural manifestations. The work did much to bolster Aubrey's posthumous reputation as a superstitious and credulous eccentric.

=== Other works ===
Aubrey's papers also included "Architectonica Sacra"; and "Erin Is God" (notes on ecclesiastical antiquities).

Aubrey's "Adversaria Physica" was a scientific commonplace book, which by 1692 amounted to a folio "an inch thick". It is lost, although extracts have survived in the form of copies.

Aubrey wrote two plays, both comedies intended for Thomas Shadwell. The first has not survived; the second, "Countrey Revell", remained unfinished.

== In popular culture ==
In 1967, English director Patrick Garland created a one-man show, Brief Lives, based on Dick's edition of Aubrey's work. Starring Roy Dotrice, it became the most successful one-man production ever seen, with Dotrice giving over 1800 performances across forty years on both sides of the Atlantic. For many, the play became an essential means of understanding a "vanished time" and one version of it. Aubrey scholars, however, have sometimes seen the production as overemphasising its subject's eccentricities and lack of organisation, to the detriment of a wider appreciation of his contributions to scholarship.

In the Doctor Who serial The Stones of Blood (1978) - which features a Neolithic stone circle - the Fourth Doctor quips, "I always thought that Druidism was founded by John Aubrey in the seventeenth century as a joke. He had a great sense of humour, John Aubrey."

In 2008, Aubrey's Brief Lives was a five-part drama serial on Radio 4. Writer Nick Warburton intertwined some of Aubrey's biographical sketches with the story of the turbulent friendship between Aubrey and Anthony Wood. Abigail le Fleming produced and directed.

In 2015, Ruth Scurr published John Aubrey: My Own Life, a semi-fictional "diary" or "autobiography" of Aubrey, which draws heavily on Aubrey's own surviving scattered writings (with minor adaptation and modernisation), but is essentially an artificial construction by Scurr.

== See also ==
- Cockle bread

== Sources ==
- Bennett, Kate (2015). John Aubrey: Brief Lives with An Apparatus for the Lives of our English Mathematical Writers. Oxford: OUP.
- Bennett, Kate (1999). "John Aubrey's Oxfordshire Collections: an edition of Aubrey annotations to his presentation copy of Robert Plot's Natural History of Oxford-shire, Bodleian Library Ashmole 1722". Oxoniensia. 64: 59–86.
- Bennett, Kate (2000). "Editing Aubrey". In Bray, Joe; Handley, Miriam; Henry, Anne C. (eds.). Ma(r)king the Text. Aldershot: Ashgate. pp. 271–90. ISBN 0-7546-0168-4.
- Bennett, Kate (2001). "John Aubrey's collections and the early modern museum". Bodleian Library Record. 17 (3–4): 213–45. doi:10.3828/blr.2001.17.3-4.213. PMID 18846728.
- Bennett, Kate (2007). "John Aubrey, Hint-Keeper: life-writing and the encouragement of natural philosophy in the pre-Newtonian seventeenth century". Seventeenth Century. 22 (2): 358–80. doi:10.1080/0268117X.2007.10555599. S2CID 165500678.
- Bennett, Kate (2009). "John Aubrey and the Lives of our English Mathematical Writers". In Robson, Eleanor; Stedall, Jacqueline (eds.). The Oxford Handbook of the History of Mathematics. Oxford: OUP. pp. 329–52.
- Balme, Maurice, ed. (2001). Two antiquaries: a selection from the correspondence of John Aubrey and Anthony Wood. Edinburgh: Durham Academic Press. ISBN 1-900838-11-7.
- Britton, John (1845). Memoir of John Aubrey, F.R.S. London: Wiltshire Topographical Society.
- Burl, Aubrey (2010). John Aubrey & Stone Circles: Britain's first archaeologist, from Avebury to Stonehenge. Stroud: Amberley. ISBN 978-1-4456-0157-1.
- Clark, Andrew, ed. (1891–1900). The Life and Times of Anthony Wood. Vol. 4. Oxford. pp. 191–193.
- Collier, John, ed. (1931). The Scandal and Credulities of John Aubrey. London: Peter Davies.
- Colvin, H. M. (1968). "Aubrey's Chronologia Architectonica". In Summerson, John (ed.). Concerning Architecture: essays on architectural writers and writing presented to Nikolaus Pevsner. London: Allen Lane. pp. 1–12. OL 18238213W.
- Dragstra, Henk (2008). "'Before woomen were Readers': how John Aubrey wrote female oral history". In Lamb, M.E.; Bamford, Karen (eds.). Oral traditions and gender in early modern literary texts. Aldershot: Ashgate. pp. 41–56.
- Fellows-Jensen, Gillian (2000). "John Aubrey, Pioneer Onomast?". Nomina. 23: 89–106.
- Fox, Adam (2008) [2004]. "Aubrey, John (1626–1697)". Oxford Dictionary of National Biography (online ed.). Oxford University Press. doi:10.1093/ref:odnb/886. (Subscription, Wikipedia Library access or UK public library membership required.)
- Horsfall Turner, Olivia (2011). "'The Windows of this Church are of several Fashions': architectural form and historical method in John Aubrey's 'Chronologia Architectonica'". Architectural History. 54: 171–93. doi:10.1017/S0066622X00004032. S2CID 194919640.
- Hunter, Michael (1975). John Aubrey and the Realm of Learning. London: Duckworth. ISBN 0-7156-0818-5.
- Hunter, Michael (2015). "John Aubrey's Brief Lives: the edition we have been waiting for". The Seventeenth Century. 30 (3): 339–51. doi:10.1080/0268117X.2015.1060672. S2CID 163086731.
- Kite, John Bruce (1993). A Study of the Works and Reputation of John Aubrey (1626–1697), with emphasis on his 'Brief lives'. Lampeter: Edward Mellen Press.
- Masson, David (July 1856). "Vol. XXIV, pp. 153–182". British Quarterly Review.
- Montégut, Émile (1891). Heures de lecture d'un critique: John Aubrey, Pope, William Collins, Sir John Maundeville. Paris.
- Poole, William (2010). John Aubrey and the Advancement of Learning. Oxford: Bodleian Library. ISBN 978-1-85124-319-8.
- Powell, Anthony (1948). John Aubrey and His Friends. London: Eyre & Spottiswoode.
- Tylden-Wright, David (1991). John Aubrey: A Life. London: HarperCollins. ISBN 0-00-215097-2.
