= Cockle bread =

British corn or wheat bread

- Type: Bread
- Place of origin: England
- Main ingredients: corn or wheat flour
- Ingredients generally used: Cockle weed

Cockle bread was an inferior type of British corn or wheat bread mixed with "cockle weed". In the 17th century a practice known as "moulding" cockle-bread had a sexual connotation. Cockle bread is also mentioned in a 19th-century nursery rhyme.

== Cockle weed bread ==
The play The Old Wives' Tale by George Peele, first published in 1595, has a reference to "cockle-bread". The editor of a 20th-century edition of the play, Charles Whitworth, points to the "cockle" as a weed found in corn and wheat fields, and suggests that "cockle-bread" was possibly an inferior bread, made from those grains, with the weed mixed into it. William Carew Hazlitt writing in Faith and Folklore: a dictionary in 1905, gives the same explanation of "Cockle Bread" as Whitworth.

== The "moulding" of cocklebread ==
In the 17th century, a sexual connotation is attached not to the bread itself but to "a dance that involved revealing the buttocks and simulating sexual activity"; this activity was known as "moulding" cockle bread.

John Aubrey writes of "young wenches" indulging in a "wanton sport" called "moulding of Cocklebread" where they would "get upon a Tableboard, and as they gather-up their knees and their Coates with their hands as high as they can, and then they wabble to and fro with the Buttocks as if they were kneading of Dough with their Arses". While doing this, the young women would sing the rhyme:

My dame is sick, and gone to bed.
And I'll go mould my cocklebread!
Up with my heels and down with my head,
And this is the way to mould cockle-bread.

Aubrey compares this, writing "I did imagine nothing to have been in this but mere wantonness of youth ... but I find in Burchardus, in his book Methodus Confitendi... one of the articles of interrogating a young woman is, if she did ever subigere panem clunibus, and then bake it, and give it to the one she loved to eate". From this he decides "I find it to be a relic of natural magic, an unlawful philtrum" (i.e. aphrodisiac or love charm).

Writing in A Dictionary of Sexual Language and Imagery in Shakespearean and Stuart Literature, Gordon Williams sees Aubrey's "wanton sport" in a 1641 mention of moulding cocklebread, a "sexual sense" in a prayer mentioning the practice from 1683, and considers it "transparent" in the 1683 Fifteen Real Conforts Of Matrimony which "tells how 'Mrs. Betty has been Moulding of Cockle-bread, and her mother discovers it'; the consequence is a 'By-blow in her belly'".

== Nursery rhyme ==
In the 19th and 20th centuries, Cockle-Bread became the name of a children's game, played to a nursery rhyme in which the bread is mentioned:

My granny is sick and now is dead.
And we'll go mould some cocklety bread.
Up with the heels and down with the head.
And that's the way to make cocklety bread.

Writing in Observations on the Popular Antiquities of Great Britain in 1854, John Brand describes the nursery rhyme as "modern", but adds that its connection to the earlier "moulding" of cockle bread "is by no means generally understood".

== See also ==
- Cordax
