= Paper Fashion Show =

Fashion event in Denver, Colorado

- Status: Active
- Genre: Fashion
- Frequency: Annual
- Locations: Denver, Colorado
- Country: United States
- Years active: 2005-present
- Inaugurated: 2005
- Most recent: 2024
- Next event: 2025
- Organiser: The One Club for Creativity
- Website: www.paperfashionshow.com

The Paper Fashion Show, is a fundraising fashion show and competition involving outfits made almost entirely from paper, held annually in Denver.

== History ==
The first Paper Fashion Show was held in 2005 at the Cervantes Ballroom, it was hosted by drag queen comedians and included 25 paper designs. In 2018, the show was incorporated into a day of Denver Fashion Week. In 2020 and 2021 the show was put on hiatus due to the COVID-19 pandemic, returning in 2022 for the 16th annual show.

== Details ==
The event is the largest paper based fashion event in the United States. Organized by the local Denver chapter of The One Club For Creativity, a portion of the proceeds go towards Downtown Aurora Visual Arts, which is an organization that provides after-school art programs for at-risk youth.

Entries into the contest are submitted either solo or as a team. The requirements include maneuverability and a 90% paper to other material ratio. The remaining 10% of the design usually encompasses materials such as staples and yarn, which help hold the designs together.

An alternating judge panel of Denver area designers and creatives selects a 1st, 2nd, and 3rd-place winner, other awards have changed through the years, including, Star Student Award, Art Director's Spirit, DAVA's Choice, and Audience Favorite. The program has included both drag and dance performances. Some of the previous participants have gone on to have successful careers in business and creative professions.

The Paper Fashion Show sponsors typically include paper producers, such as Xpedx, Mohawk Paper, and Spicer's Paper, who supply paper for the designers to use.

== 1st Place Winners ==
| Season | Year | Designer/s | Design Name | Theme |
|---|---|---|---|---|
| 5th | 2009 | Randall Erkelens, Joy Baldwin, Connie Tran | Peacock Princess | |
| 6th | 2010 | Lonnie Hanzon | A Walk In The Sculpture Park | |
| 7th | 2011 | Barry Brown, Elizabeth Barnes, Stephanie Ingraham, Robyn Winters | Caged Beauty | |
| 8th | 2012 | Barry Brown, Elizabeth Barnes, Stephanie Ingraham, Robyn Winters | Pulp Function | |
| 9th | 2013 | Barry Brown | Gloria Deo | |
| 10th | 2014 | | | |
| 11th | 2015 | | | |
| 12th | 2016 | Kevlyn Walsh, Sarah Bouna | Artemis Queen of the Hunt | |
| 13th | 2017 | | | |
| 14th | 2018 | Norberto Mojardin | Aztec Princess | Haute Couture in Paper Wonderland |
| 15th | 2019 | Kim Lim, Chau Wilson | Sakura | Flight |
| 16th | 2022 | Veronica Dewey | Nature's Shadow | Wonderland |
| 17th | 2023 | Brielle Killip, Christopher Geissinger | Tickle Me Pink | Art Masters |
| 18th | 2024 | | | |
