= Lonnie Hanzon =

American artist

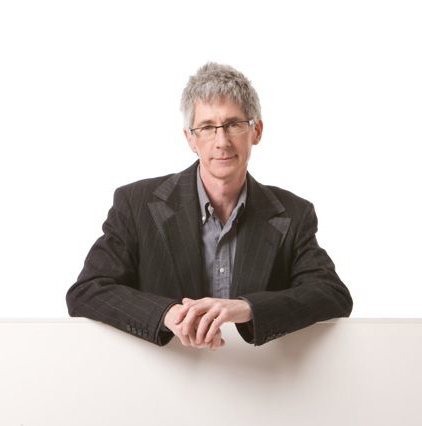
- Born: 1959 (age 66–67)
- Occupations: artist and designer
- Known for: Evolution of the Ball sculpture at Coors Field

Lonnie Hanzon is an American artist based in Colorado who designed the gateway sculpture Evolution of the Ball at Coors Field in Denver, Colorado.

== Career ==
Hanzon was raised in Pine, Colorado.

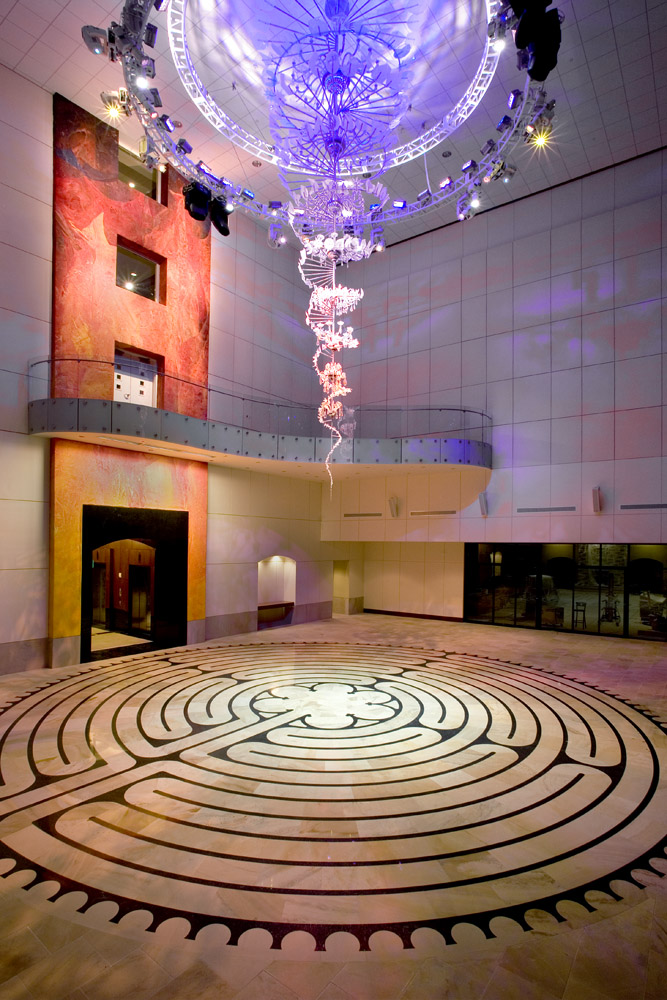
Chandelier Chardin commissioned by John Madden Company. Installed at the Palazzo Verdi in Greenwood Village, Colorado.

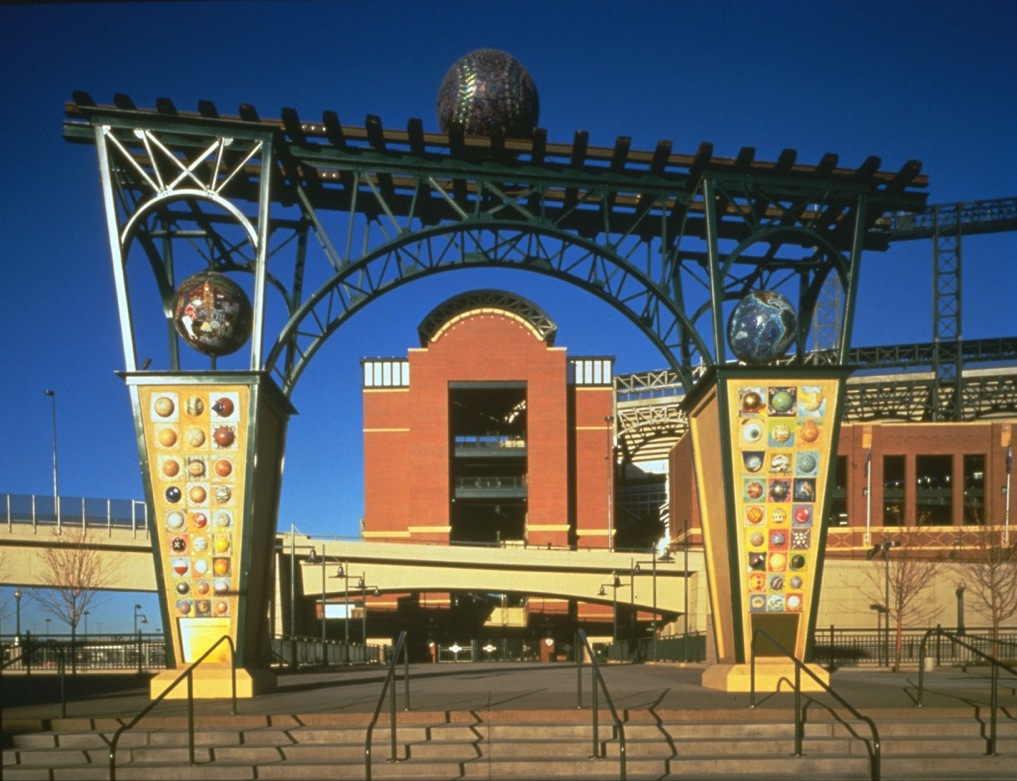
Gateway sculpture at Coors Field baseball stadium in Denver, Colorado. Mixed media, 1995

A largely self-educated artist, he made his own costumes and sets. In 2010 he won first place in the Paper Fashion Show put on by The One Club For Creativity Denver (formerly Art Directors Club of Denver).

His Christmas window display in Omaha in 1987 was the first for which retailers were charged a one dollar admission to control crowds.

Using LED, halogen bulbs, fiber optic lights and other light sources, Hanzon designed Christmas light displays for Denver's Parade of Lights and for a large mall in Hong Kong, which was at the time the largest holiday light array in Hong Kong. He also did work in Houston, Dallas, Las Vegas, and, most frequently, in Colorado. In addition to his "Evolution of the Ball" display at Coors Field, Hanzon has produced other installations throughout Colorado including at the Red Rocks Community College, Kenneth King Performing Arts Center, Denver Botanic Gardens, and Olde Town Arvada.

He installed displays on the mile-long pedestrian mall that included 22 artists. In Larimer Square and around Lower Downtown. He has been called "a bit of a wizard" in residence and creative director at the Museum of Outdoor Arts during which time he designed the Hudson Holiday display at the Hudson Gardens and Events Center in Littleton in 2009 and 2010. Hanzon also rebuilt the annual Parade of Lights in Denver by creating 13 new electrical floats with the idea of creating a narrative through visual art.

== Film and television ==
Hanzon was involved with a HGTV holiday special, and a Neiman Marcus' annual holiday season window displays. A 2008 window display he designed for a store in Cherry Creek North was featured on a special holiday windows program on HGTV. In 2005, The Food Network aired a special in which Hanzon took the ultimate BBQ Rig Design Challenge.

== Select installations and displays ==
- Stone Clouds 1,2,&3 Neiman Marcus Art collection – Walnut Creek, California - 2012
- Hudson Holiday – produced with Museum of Outdoor Arts and Hudson Gardens. Littleton, Colorado - 2009, 2010
- Emry Gweldig’s Wondrous Keep – produced with Museum of Outdoor Arts and Cherry Creek North. Denver, Colorado - 2008
- Ice + Snow – Holiday light show and performance. Museum of Outdoor Arts. Samson Park, Greenwood Village, Colorado - 2006
- Evolution of the Ball – Gateway sculpture at Coors Field. Mixed media - Commissioned by the Downtown Major League Stadium District. Denver, Colorado - 1995
