= Tent dress =

Type of loose-fitting dress

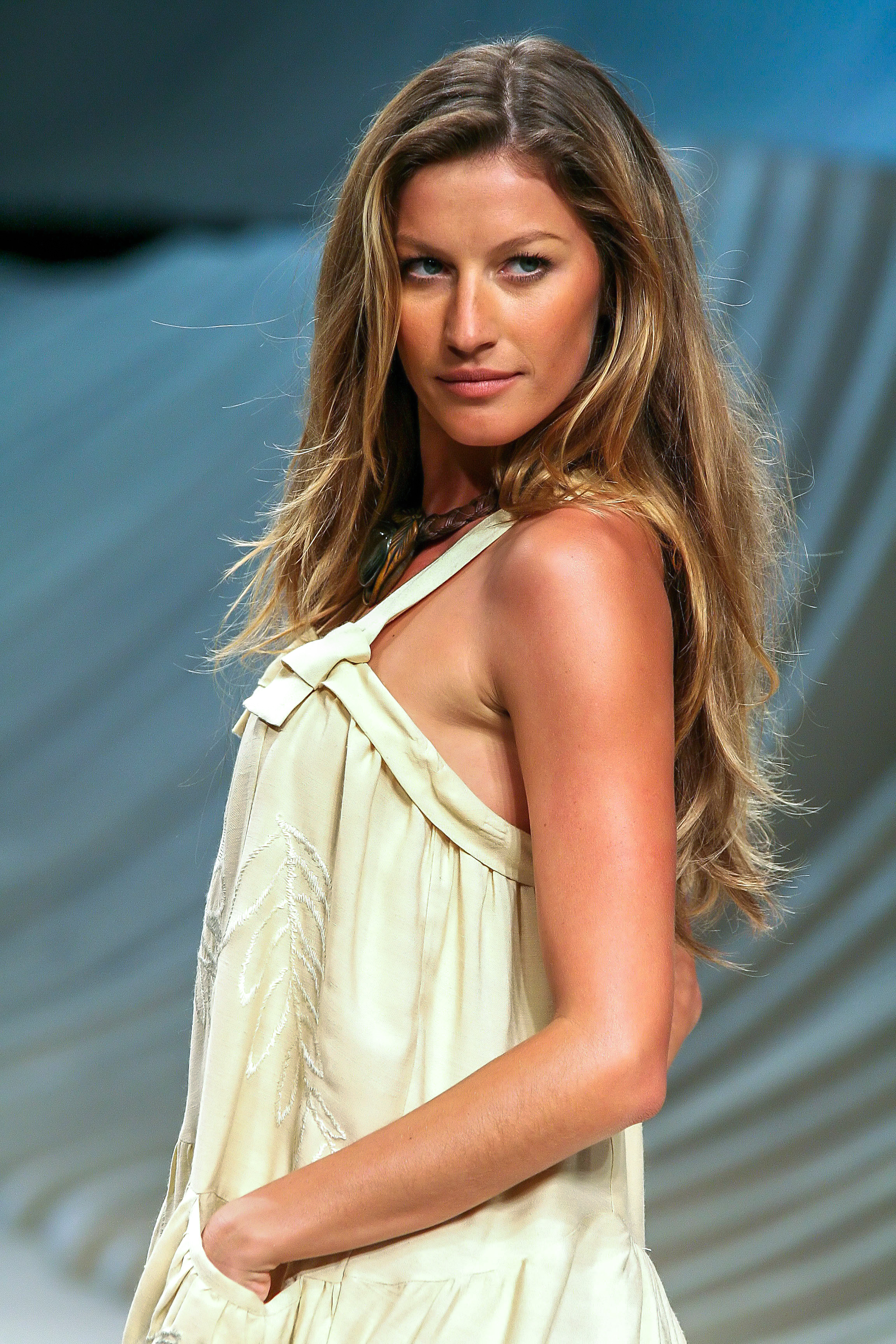
Supermodel Gisele Bündchen wearing a tent dress

A tent dress is a dress that hangs loose from the shoulder to below the hips and does not have a waistline. They are worn without belts.

The tent dress was one of the trends of 2007. They are sold in most department stores or clothes-carrying supermarkets, and may also be home-made or tailor-made.

== Design ==
Tent dresses may be made from a variety of fabrics, including solid, striped, polka dotted, or floral prints (and sometimes even a combination), and are often in bright colors which would not normally be matched (e.g. orange, purple, and neon green). They vary in sleeve and dress length, and can be greatly altered with fringe, lace, buttons (particularly large ones), and other embellishments such as fake jewels, sequins or glitter. They are usually long-sleeved, fluffy-sleeved, or sleeveless. They are often worn with skinny jeans or leggings, as many tent dresses are so short as to leave the crotch visible. They are normally worn as mini dresses; but can be longer, or so short as to be little different from a shirt.
