= Olivia Horsfall Turner =

British architectural historian, author and broadcaster

- Born: Olivia Jane Horsfall Turner; January 1980 (age 46)
- Education: Cambridge University, Yale University, University College London
- Occupation: Architectural historian
- Website: http://www.oliviahorsfallturner.com

Olivia Jane Horsfall Turner (born January 1980) is a British architectural historian, author and broadcaster. In 2013, she was the writer and presenter of the television series Dreaming the Impossible: Unbuilt Britain for BBC Four.

== Early life and education ==
Olivia Horsfall Turner was born in January 1980. She was brought up in Greenwich, south London, where she became interested in architecture through the influence of her father, Jonathan Horsfall Turner, who had been involved in archaeological recording while a schoolboy at Canterbury. She studied history and history of art at Cambridge University, graduating with first class honours in 2002, and then completed an MA at Yale University. She received her PhD from University College London.

== Career ==
Horsfall Turner worked at Trinity College Dublin, followed by a position with English Heritage as an architectural investigator and secondment to the Survey of London as an historian.

In September 2013, Horsfall Turner was appointed a director of The Society of Architectural Historians of Great Britain, which position she held until September 2015.

She joined the Victoria and Albert Museum in 2014 as Curator, Designs and Lead Curator for the V&A + RIBA Architecture Partnership.

== Broadcasting ==
In 2013, Horsfall Turner was the writer and presenter of the television series Dreaming the Impossible: Unbuilt Britain for BBC Four, produced by Timeline Films. The three-part series looked at plans for ambitious buildings that were never built. Horsfall Turner has been described as having "a delicately old-fashioned manner" and "the flamboyancy of the school swot's big sister".

== Selected publications ==
- "The Mirror of Great Britain": National identity in seventeenth-century British architecture. Spire, 2012. (Editor) ISBN 978-1-904965-38-1
