= Shahal M. Khan =

American venture capitalist and executive

- Born: New York, United States
- Education: American University; Johns Hopkins University

Shahal M. Khan (born New York, United States) is an American businessman. Khan is primarily known for his move to purchase the Plaza Hotel in New York City from the Sahara Group, alongside Kamran Hakim, for $600 million.

== Career ==
- Founder of Burtech Acquisition Corporation- NASDAQ Listed (BRKHU) SPAC.
- Founder of the Khan Institute for Economics and Cybersecurity partners with American University in Washington D.C.
- Founder of BIDC (Burkhan Investment Development Corp) agrees to fund $20 million into Enercap Holdings.
- Founder of Tempus Network agrees to fund $25 million into GMEX Group.
- Founder of Trinity Hospitality Group (www.trinityholdings.world)
- Founder of Fortune Investment House, a Bahrain-based real estate investment Bank.
- Founder of Global Voice Telecom- The First Wholesale International VoIP provider for Global Telecom Operators.
- CEO of Centile Ltd, a French IPBX software company based in Monaco, from 2004 to 2006.
- Founder and Vice Chairman of Zebasolar, a solar energy company which received the first Solar License in India.
- Partner at GlobalTurk Capital, a Turkish merchant bank, from 2012 to 2016.
- Co-Founder of Mice360 which merged with Global Data Sentinel CyberSecurity Firm (GDS360 also known as Cyvolve ) in 2016.

=== Plaza Hotel ===
In May 2018, Khan and Kamran Hakim, a prominent New York City landlord and property investor, entered into an agreement to purchase the Plaza Hotel, an historic and high-profile luxury property in Manhattan, for $600 million from Sahara India Pariwar, a London-based Indian conglomerate. The acquisition is partially financed through a $415 million loan from British real estate investors David and Simon Reuben.

== Personal life ==
Khan was born in New York, United States, of Indian and Pakistani heritage. He received a bachelor's degree in economics from American University and a master's degree in international development from the Johns Hopkins University Nitze School of Advanced International Studies. Khan primarily resides in Washington, D.C., Dubai, and the Portuguese Riviera (Quinta da Beloura, Sintra).
