= Plaza Hotel =

Hotel in Manhattan, New York

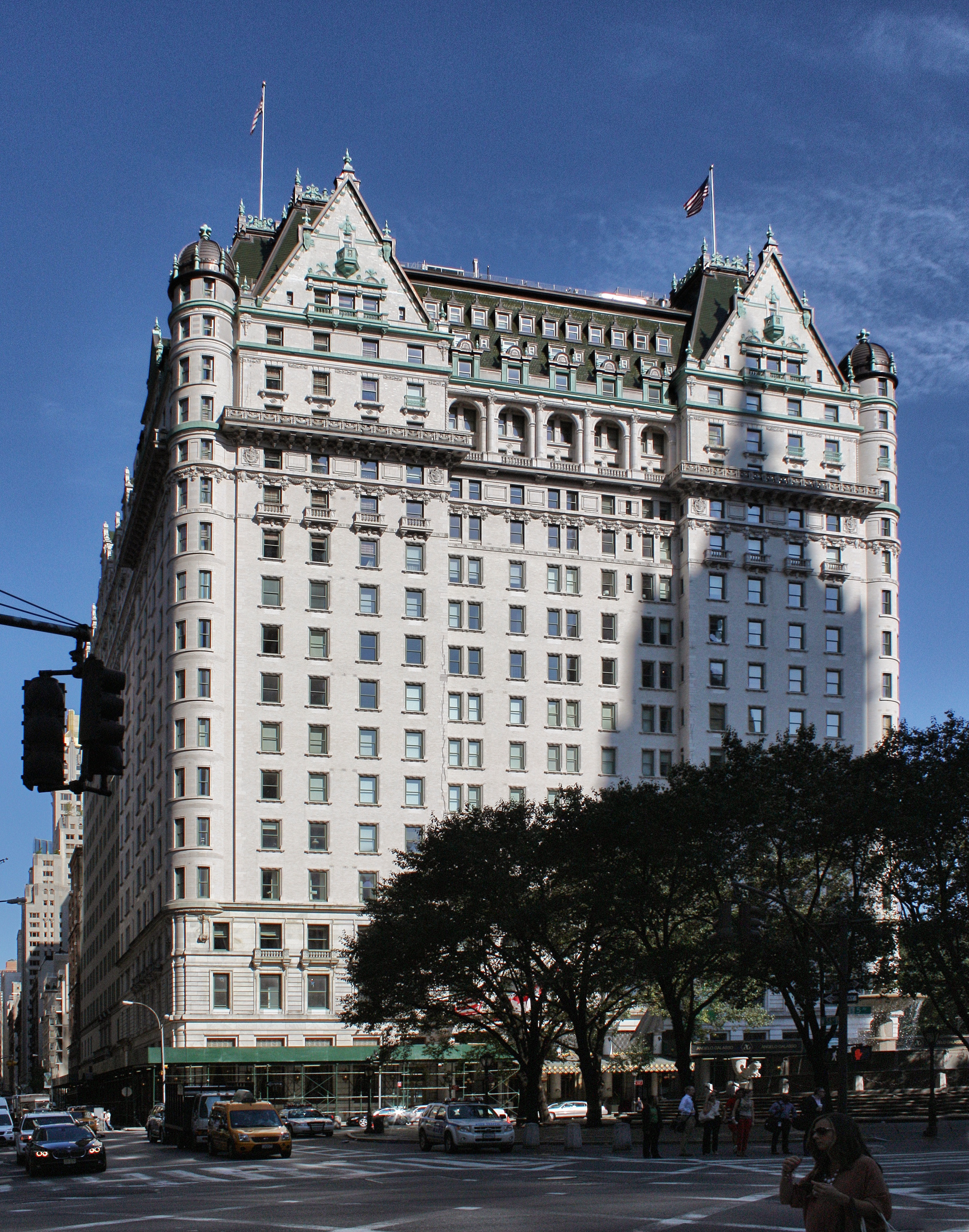
- Former names: Westin Plaza
- Alternative names: The Plaza
- Etymology: Grand Army Plaza

General information
- Type: Luxury hotel and condominiums
- Architectural style: French Renaissance-inspired château style
- Location: 768 Fifth Avenue; Manhattan, New York
- Coordinates: 40°45′52″N 73°58′28″W
- Construction started: July 1, 1905
- Opened: October 1, 1907
- Renovated: 1919–1921 (annex), 1929, 1943–1945, 1964–1965, 2005–2008
- Cost: $12.5 million (Note: Equivalent to $314.89 million in 2025 (Note: Johnston, Louis; Williamson, Samuel H. (2023). "What Was the U.S. GDP Then?". MeasuringWorth. United States Gross Domestic Product deflator figures follow the MeasuringWorth series.))
- Owner: Katara Hospitality
- Operator: Fairmont Hotels and Resorts

Height
- Height: 251.92 ft (76.79 m)

Technical details
- Floor count: 18
- Lifts/elevators: 11
- Grounds: 53,772 ft^{2} (4,995.6 m^{2})

Design and construction
- Architects: Henry Janeway Hardenbergh (original); Warren and Wetmore (annex)
- Developer: U.S. Realty Company
- Main contractor: George A. Fuller Company

Other information
- Number of rooms: 282 hotel rooms 181 condominiums
- Public transit: Subway: N, R, and W trains at Fifth Avenue–59th Street

Website
- theplazany.com
- Plaza Hotel
- U.S. National Register of Historic Places
- U.S. National Historic Landmark
- New York State Register of Historic Places
- New York City Landmark
- Location: 768 Fifth Avenue, Manhattan, New York
- Built: 1907
- Architects: Henry J. Hardenbergh; Thomas Hastings, et al.
- Architectural style: Late 19th and 20th Century Revivals (château style)
- NRHP reference No.: 78001878
- NYSRHP No.: 06101.001804
- NYCL No.: 0265, 2174

Significant dates
- Added to NRHP: November 29, 1978
- Designated NHL: June 24, 1986
- Designated NYSRHP: June 23, 1980
- Designated NYCL: December 9, 1969 (exterior); July 12, 2005 (interior)

The Plaza Hotel (also known as The Plaza) is a luxury hotel and condominium apartment building in Midtown Manhattan in New York City. It is located on the western side of Grand Army Plaza, after which it is named, just west of Fifth Avenue, and is between 58th Street and Central Park South (a.k.a. 59th Street), at the southeastern corner of Central Park. Its primary address is 768 Fifth Avenue, though the residential entrance is One Central Park South. Since 2018, the hotel has been owned by the Qatari firm Katara Hospitality.

The 18-story, French Renaissance-inspired château style building was designed by Henry Janeway Hardenbergh. The facade is made of marble at the base, with white brick covering the upper stories, and is topped by a mansard roof. The ground floor contains the two primary lobbies, as well as a corridor connecting the large ground-floor restaurant spaces, including the Oak Room, the Oak Bar, the Edwardian Room, the Palm Court, and the Terrace Room. The upper stories contain the ballroom and a variety of residential condominiums, condo-hotel suites, and short-term hotel suites. At its peak, the Plaza Hotel had over 800 rooms. Following a renovation in 2008, the building has had 282 hotel rooms and 181 condos.

A hotel of the same name was built from 1883 to 1890. The original hotel was replaced by the current structure from 1905 to 1907; Warren and Wetmore designed an expansion to the Plaza Hotel that was added from 1919 to 1921, and several major renovations were conducted through the rest of the 20th century. The Plaza Operating Company, which erected the current building, operated the hotel until 1943. Subsequently, it was sold to several owners during the remainder of the 20th century, including Conrad Hilton, A.M. Sonnabend, Westin Hotels & Resorts, Donald Trump, and a partnership of City Developments Limited and Al-Waleed bin Talal. The Plaza Hotel was renovated again after El Ad Properties purchased it in 2005, and the hotel was subsequently sold to Sahara India Pariwar in 2012 and then to Katara Hospitality in 2018. The hotel has been managed by Fairmont Hotels and Resorts since 2005.

Since its inception, the Plaza Hotel has become an icon of New York City, with numerous wealthy and famous guests. The restaurant spaces and ballrooms have hosted events such as balls, benefits, weddings, and press conferences. The hotel's design, as well as its location near Central Park, has generally received acclaim. In addition, the Plaza Hotel has appeared in numerous books and films. The New York City Landmarks Preservation Commission designated the hotel's exterior and some of its interior spaces as city landmarks, and the building is also a National Historic Landmark and part of the Historic Hotels of America program.

== Site ==
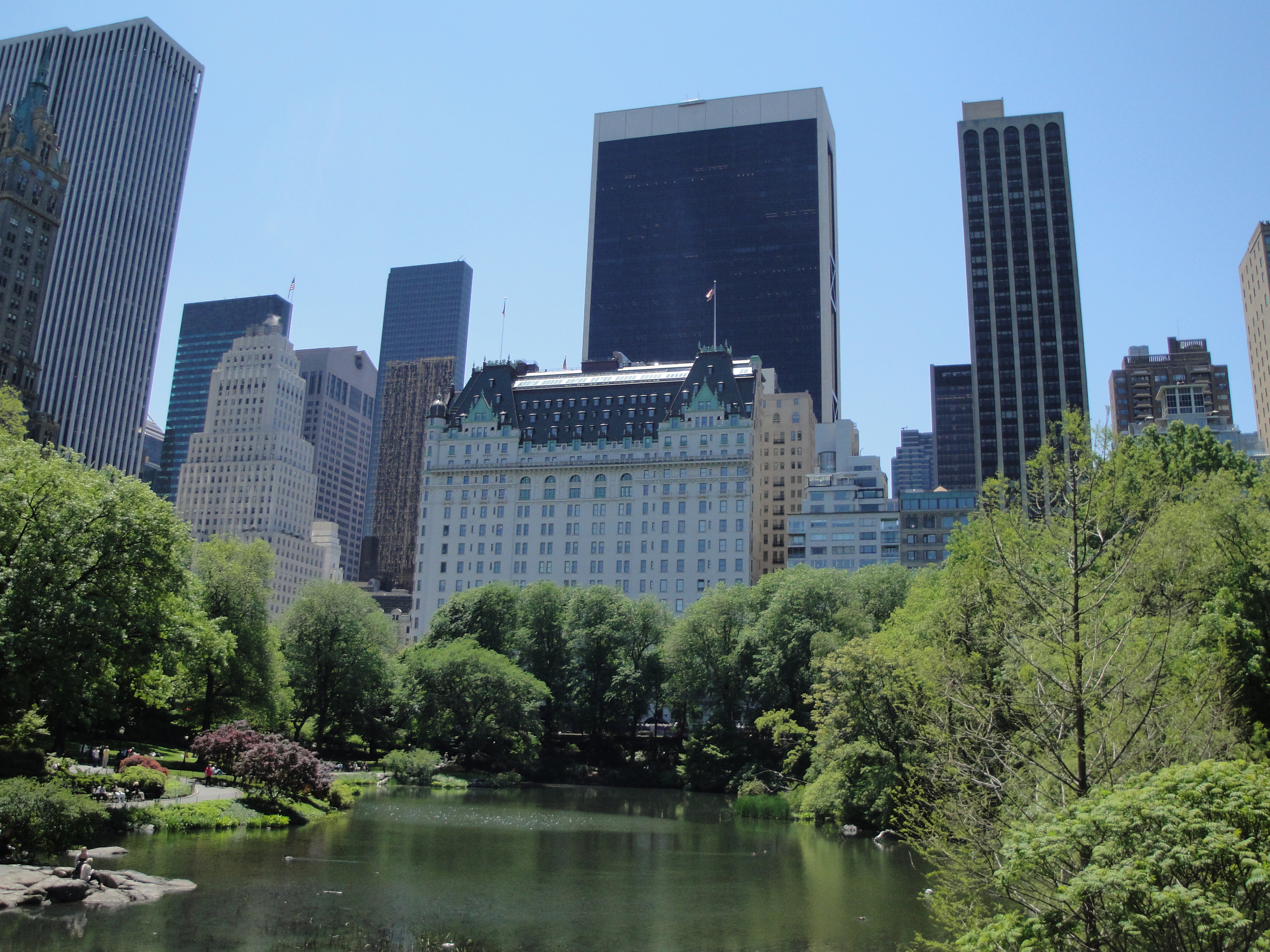
The Plaza Hotel and surrounding buildings (including the Solow Building in the center background) as seen from Central Park in May 2010

The Plaza Hotel is at 768 Fifth Avenue and One Central Park South in the Midtown Manhattan neighborhood of New York City. It faces Central Park South (59th Street) and the Pond and Hallett Nature Sanctuary in Central Park to the north; Grand Army Plaza to the east; and 58th Street to the south. Fifth Avenue itself is across Grand Army Plaza from the hotel. The hotel's site covers 53,772 square feet (4,995.6 m^{2}). It measures 285 feet (87 m) along 58th Street and 275 feet (84 m) along Central Park South, with a depth of 200.83 feet (61.21 m) between the two streets. As completed in 1907, it measured 145 feet (44 m) along 58th Street and 250 feet (76 m) along Central Park South, with an "L" running the entire 200-foot depth of the lot along Grand Army Plaza.

The hotel is near the General Motors Building to the east; the Park Lane Hotel to the west; and the Solow Building, Paris Theater, and Bergdorf Goodman Building to the south. The hotel's main entrance faces the Pulitzer Fountain in the southern portion of Grand Army Plaza. The southern portion of Grand Army Plaza and the Pulitzer Fountain date to 1916. An entrance to the Fifth Avenue–59th Street station of the New York City Subway's N, R, and W trains is within the base of the hotel at Central Park South.

Fifth Avenue between 42nd Street and Central Park South was relatively undeveloped throughout the late 19th century, when brownstone rowhouses were built on the avenue. By the early 1900s, that section of Fifth Avenue was becoming commercialized. The first decade of the 20th century saw the construction of hotels, stores, and clubs such as the St. Regis New York, the University Club of New York, and the Gotham Hotel. The corner of Fifth Avenue, Central Park South, and 59th Street was developed with the Plaza, Savoy, and New Netherland hotels during the 1890s; the Savoy would be replaced in 1927 by the Savoy-Plaza Hotel, which itself would be demolished in 1964. All three hotels contributed to Fifth Avenue's importance as an upscale area.

== Architecture ==
The Plaza Hotel, a French Renaissance-inspired château-style building, is 251.92 ft (76.79 m) tall, with 18 stories. (Note: Emporis and the Council on Tall Buildings and Urban Habitat and some news media cite the Plaza as being 18 stories tall, as measured to the top of the main roof, while the New York City Department of City Planning cites the hotel as being 19 stories tall. However, Architectural Digest characterizes the hotel as having a penthouse on floors 19 through 21.) The hotel's floors are numbered according to European usage, where floor 1, corresponding to the second story, is directly above the ground floor. The building was designed by Henry Janeway Hardenbergh in 1907, with a later addition, by Warren and Wetmore, being built from 1919 to 1922. The interiors of the main public spaces were primarily designed by Hardenbergh, Warren and Wetmore, and Schultze & Weaver. The other interior spaces were by Annabelle Selldorf and date largely to a renovation in 2008. Numerous contractors were involved in the construction of the hotel, including the Atlantic Terra Cotta Company and brick contractor Pfotenhauer & Nesbit.

=== Facade ===
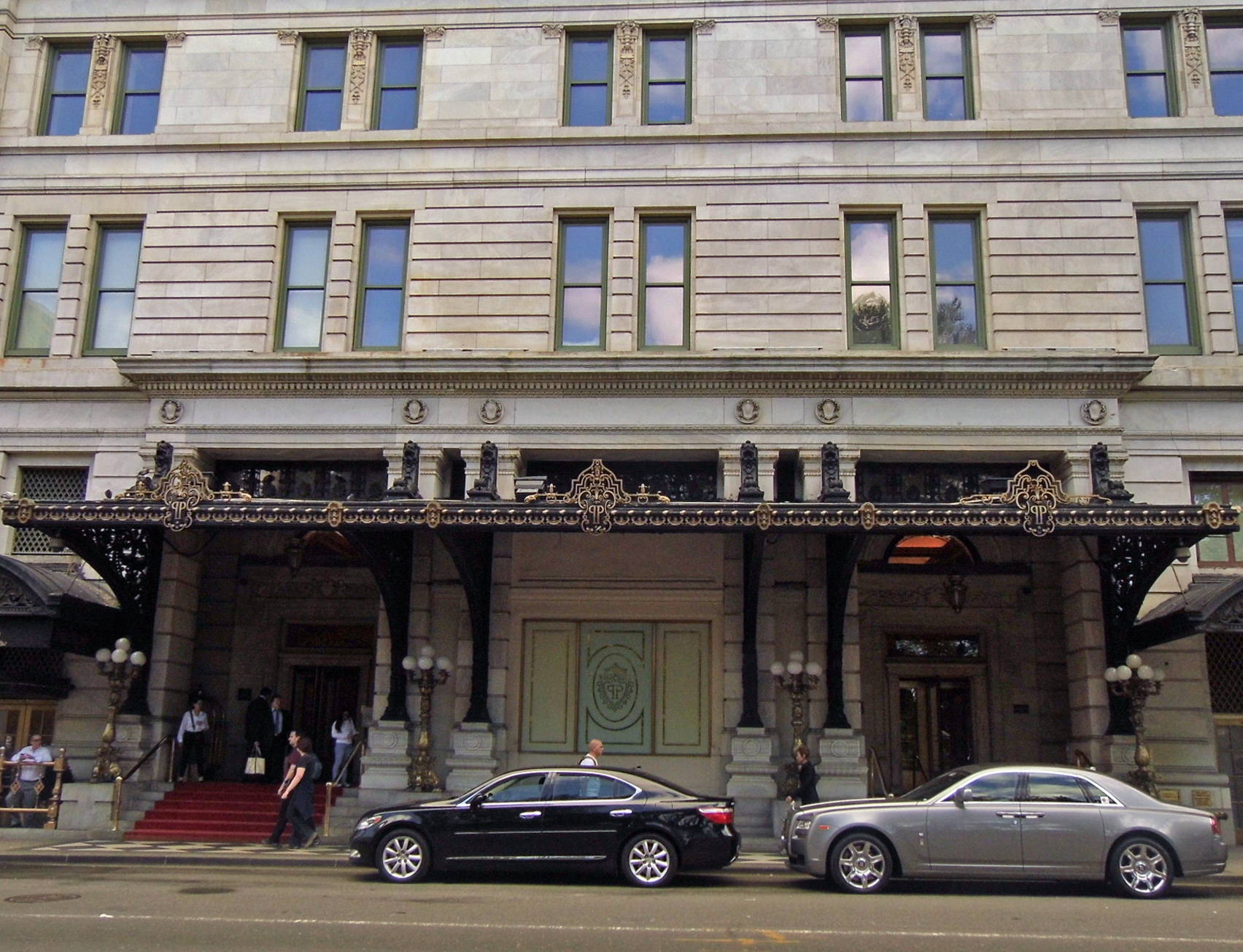
Entrance on Central Park South

The detail of the facade is concentrated on its two primary elevations, which face north toward Central Park and east toward Fifth Avenue. The facade's articulation consists of three horizontal sections similar to the components of a column, namely a base, shaft, and crown. The northern and eastern elevations are also split vertically into three portions, with the center portion being recessed. The northeastern and southeastern corners of the hotel contain rounded corners, which resemble turrets. There are numerous loggias, balustrades, columns, pilasters, balconies, and arches repeated across various parts of the facade. The 1921 annex contains a design that is largely similar to Hardenbergh's 1907 design.

==== Base ====
The first and second stories of the facade, respectively corresponding to the ground floor and floor 1 of the interior, (Note: In this article, the facade is described using standard U.S. floor numbering; i.e. the second story is directly above the ground floor. The interior floors are labeled using European floor numbering, so floor 1 is one story above ground level and corresponds to the second story in the U.S. floor numbering system.) are clad with rusticated blocks of marble. The third story, corresponding to floor 2 of the interior, contains a smooth marble surface. The hotel had two guest entrances in the 1907 design: the main entrance on Central Park South and a private entrance for long-term residents on 58th Street. The main entrance, in the center of the Central Park South facade, contains a porch above the three center bays, and large doorways. Since the hotel's 2008 renovation, the Central Park South entrance has served as the entrance to the building's condominiums.

The Grand Army Plaza side originally contained a terrace called the Champagne Porch. There were three minor entrances, including one to the porch. The Champagne Porch was replaced by a large central entry in 1921. The entrance there consists of six Tuscan-style columns, supporting a balcony on the second story, immediately above ground level. The second and third stories at the center of the Grand Army Plaza facade contains paired Corinthian-style pilasters supporting an entablature.

==== Upper stories ====
The fourth through fifteenth stories, respectively corresponding to interior floors 3 through 14, are clad with white brick and typically contain rectangular windows. These stories contain terracotta veneers that harmonize with the marble facade below it and the mansard roof above. At the center of the Central Park South facade, the five center bays at the twelfth and thirteenth stories (floors 11 and 12) contain an arcade composed of arches with paired pilasters. On the Grand Army Plaza side, there are horizontal band courses above the thirteenth story. The 58th Street facade is a scaled-down version of the two primary elevations on Central Park South and Grand Army Plaza. A marble balcony runs above the thirteenth story on all sides.

The top three floors are within a green Ludowici-tiled mansard roof with copper trim. The Grand Army Plaza side contains a gable, while the 58th Street and Central Park South sides have three stories of dormer windows. The turrets on the northeastern and southeastern corners are topped by domed roofs, which are painted green to match the color of the trees in Central Park. A penthouse occupies the top three stories, which are labeled as floors 19–21.

=== Mechanical features ===
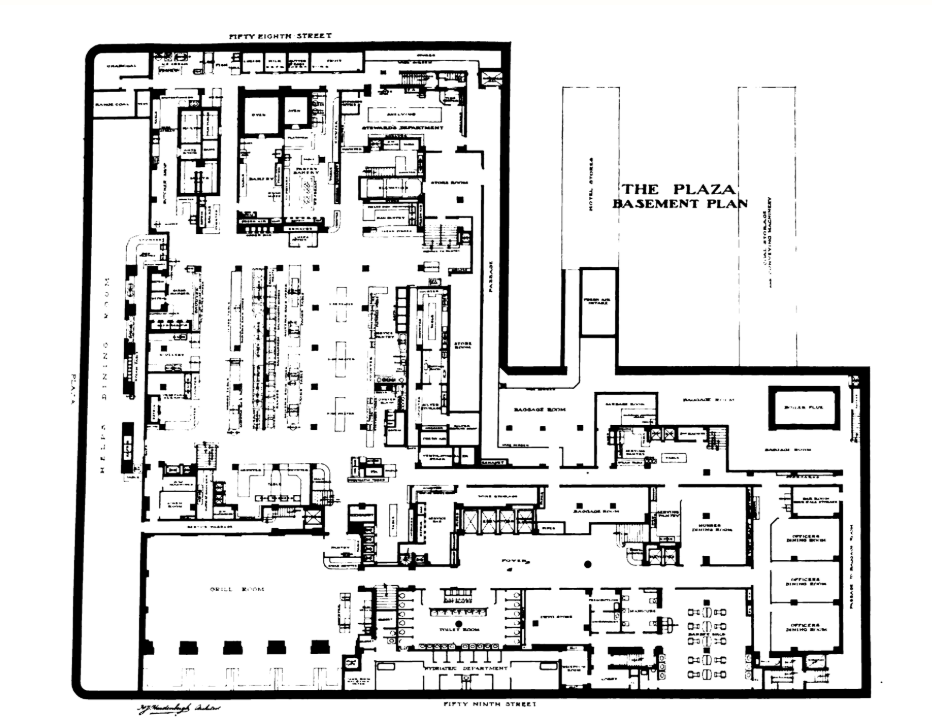
Original plan of the basement; the top of this diagram faces south

The hotel originally contained three sets of pneumatic tube mail systems: one for guest mail, another for guests to order food from the kitchen, and a third for the hotel's various operating departments. The hotel also originally had 10 passenger elevators, 13 dumbwaiters, and three sidewalk elevators. These elevators included four at the Central Park South lobby, three at the 58th Street lobby, and two near Central Park South, for long-term residents. The hotel's water storage tanks had a capacity of 75,000 U.S. gallons (280,000 L), and the hotel could filter 1,500,000 U.S. gallons (5,700,000 L) of water from the New York City water supply system each day. Water was passed through ten filters before it was pumped to rooms, and water for the kitchens and for drinking fountains passed through additional filters.

The mechanical plant in the subbasement originally contained nine 3,500 horsepower (2,600 kW) boilers; a coal plant with a capacity of 750 short tons (670 long tons; 680 t); fourteen ventilating fans; and an electric generating plant with a capacity of 1,100 kilowatts (1,500 hp). Also in the subbasement was a refrigerating plant that could make 15 short tons (13 long tons; 14 t) of ice every 24 hours, as well as a switchboard made of Tennessee marble, which controlled the hotel's power and lighting.

=== Interior ===
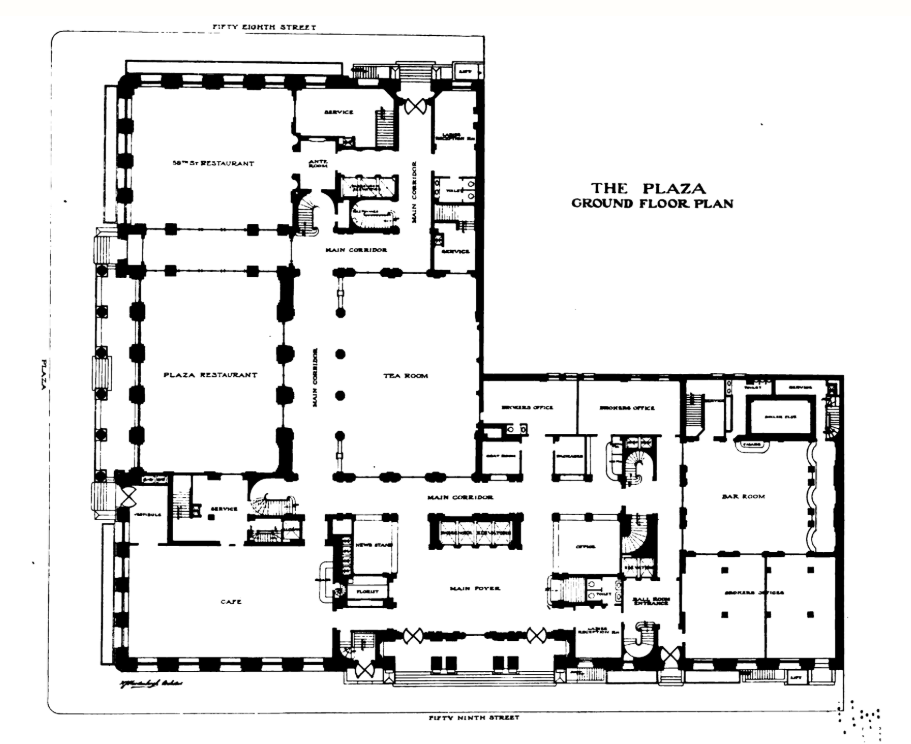
Original plan of the ground floor. The top of this diagram faces south. The Terrace Room, not shown, would be built in the space at the top right of this diagram.

The hotel has a steel frame superstructure with hollow tile floors, as well as wired-glass enclosures around all stairways and elevators. Originally, five marble staircases led from the ground floor to all of the other floors. As constructed, the stories above the ground floor surrounded a large courtyard, which was covered over with office space in a 1940s renovation. Hardenbergh, in designing the Central Park South foyer, had believed the lobby to be the most important space in the hotel, as did Warren and Wetmore when they designed the Fifth Avenue lobby. Furthermore, Warren and Wetmore had thought restaurants to be the second most significant space in a hotel, in designing the Terrace Room.

There were originally laundry rooms in the basement and on floor 18. When the hotel opened in 1907, the basement also contained a grill room, kitchen, various refrigeration rooms, and amenities such as a Victorian-style Turkish bath and a barber shop. Originally concealed within the mansard roof were the housekeepers' quarters and maids' dormitories; the eighteenth floor had carpentry, ironing, and tailors' departments. The spaces on floor 18 had become offices by the late 20th century.

==== Hallways and lobbies ====
In Hardenbergh's original design, a main corridor connects the primary spaces on the ground floor. The corridor, which still exists, connects the lobbies on 58th Street, Grand Army Plaza, and Central Park South. The layout of the ground-floor hallways dates largely from the 1921 expansion by Warren and Wetmore. The corridor wraps around the south, east, and north sides of the Palm Court, which is in the center of the ground floor. Various smaller corridors lead off the main corridor. All of the halls have floors decorated with mosaics, coffered ceilings made of plaster, and marble columns and pilasters with bronze capitals.

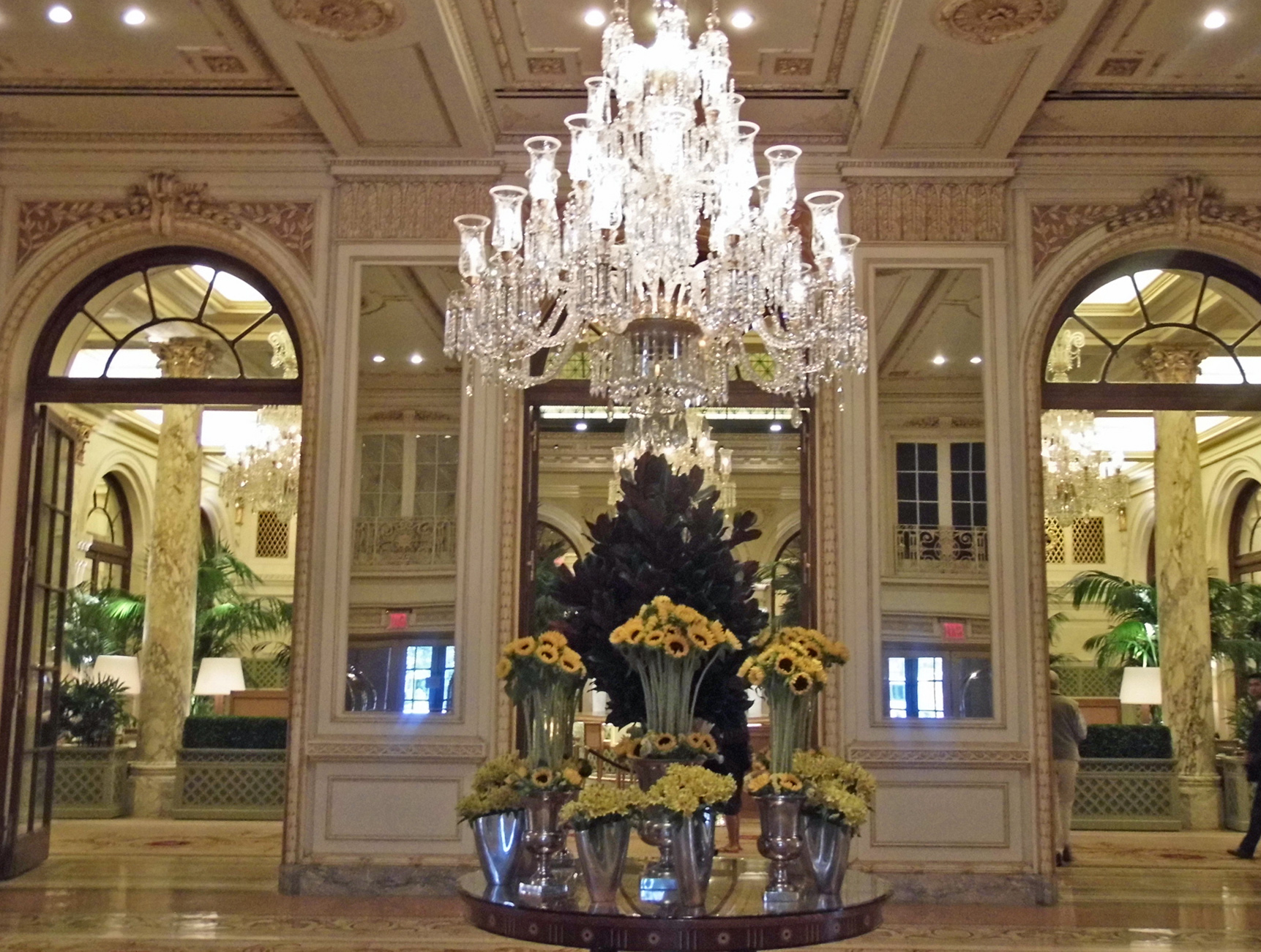
The Fifth Avenue lobby

The Central Park South entrance foyer served as the original main lobby, and is in the shape of a "U", with an overhanging mezzanine. It contains French marble walls, gilded-bronze column capitals, veined Italian-marble finishes, gold-colored trimmings, a mosaic floor, a plaster coffered ceiling, and columns similar to those in the main corridor. There is a bank of four elevators, with decorative bronze doors, directly in front of the entrance. A crystal chandelier hangs from the ceiling. The entrance doorways contain bronze frames with lunettes. Originally, the branch offices of major brokerage houses adjoined the foyer, including one office in the modern-day Oak Bar. In total, there were six brokerage houses scattered across the ground floor.

During Warren and Wetmore's expansion, the Grand Army Plaza lobby, also called the Fifth Avenue lobby, was created as the hotel's new main lobby, which occupied the former Plaza Restaurant's space. The lobby contains a U-shaped mezzanine running above the northern, eastern, and southern walls, with three entrance vestibules below the eastern section of the mezzanine. The Fifth Avenue lobby was decorated with bas-reliefs; and it preserved some of the original decorations from the Plaza Restaurant, including paneled pilasters and a beamed ceiling. Other features, including the mosaic floor and a crystal chandelier, were added by Warren and Wetmore.

The 58th Street entrance has three elevators and adjoins what was formerly a women's reception room. West of this lobby is a staircase leading up to a mezzanine-level corridor, which has marble floors and ashlar walls and abuts the Terrace Room's balcony to the north and a foyer to the south. The mezzanine-level foyer has marble floors, a painted coffered ceiling supported by two square columns, and a bank of two elevators to the ballroom on floor 1. A marble staircase, with a marble and wooden balustrade, leads from the mezzanine foyer to the ballroom level.

The layout of the upper floors was based on the layout of the ground-floor hallways because all the stairways and elevators were placed in the same position on the upper floors. On floor 2 and all subsequent stories, a centrally located C-shaped corridor runs around the north, east, and south sides of the building and connects every room.

==== Ground-floor restaurants ====
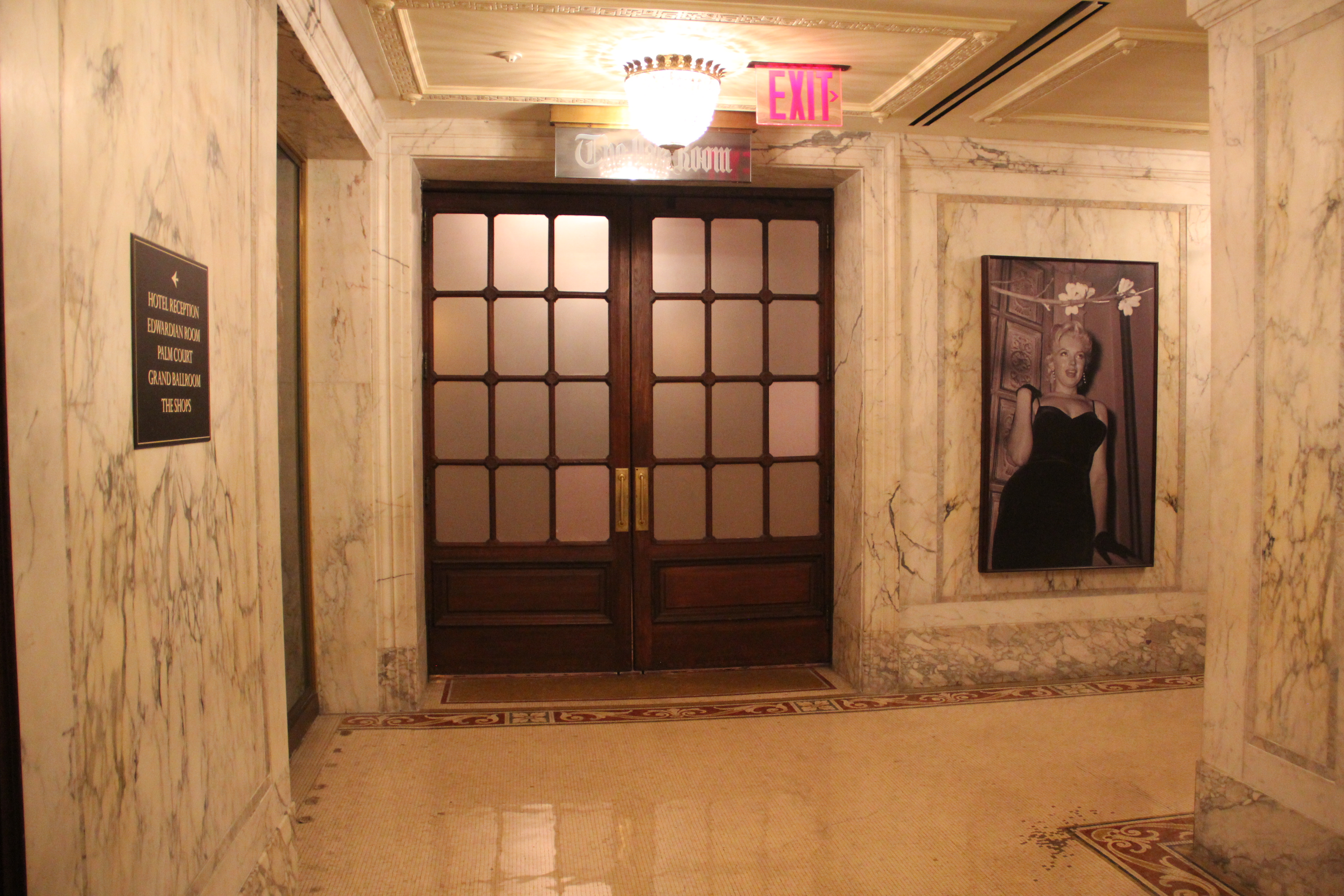
Door leading to the Oak Room

The Oak Room, on the western part of the ground floor, was built in 1907 as the bar room. It is west of the Central Park South foyer, separated from the foyer by a corridor. Compared to other spaces in the hotel, it retains more details from the original design. The Oak Room was designed in a German Renaissance style, originally by L. Alavoine and Company. It features oak walls and floors, a coved ceiling, frescoes of Bavarian castles, faux wine casks carved into the woodwork, and a grape-laden brass chandelier. The eastern wall contains a gridded glass double door leading to the main hallway, while the northern wall contains two openings to the Oak Bar.

The Oak Bar is just north of the Oak Room, at the northwest corner of the ground floor. It is designed in Tudor Revival style with a plaster ceiling, strapwork, and floral and foliage motifs. The bar room contains walnut woodwork with French furnishings. It also has three murals by Everett Shinn, which were added in a 1945 renovation and show the neighborhood as it would have appeared in 1907. Prior to the renovation, the Oak Bar served as a brokerage office.

The Edwardian Room, previously known as the Men's Grill or Fifth Avenue Cafe, is at the northeast corner of the ground floor and measures 50 by 65 feet (15 m × 20 m). It was originally designed by William Baumgarten & Company and McNulty Brothers, but it has been redecorated multiple times. It contains dark Flemish-oak paneling, 12 feet (3.7 m) high, with finishes and doorway surrounds made of Caen stone. The walls originally had oak wainscoting and an Aubosson tapestry frieze. The floor is inlaid with mosaic tiles, and the beamed ceiling is inlaid with mirrors, giving the impression of highly decorated trusses. The room is lit by large windows and eight large bronze chandeliers. The room's original color scheme was a relatively toned-down palette of green, dark brown, and gray hues. When first built, there was a musicians' balcony overlooking the room. The room also had an entrance at Grand Army Plaza, which was closed with the creation of the Fifth Avenue lobby. The space housed the Green Tulip and Plaza Suite restaurants in the late 20th century; by the 2000s, it was known as One CPS.

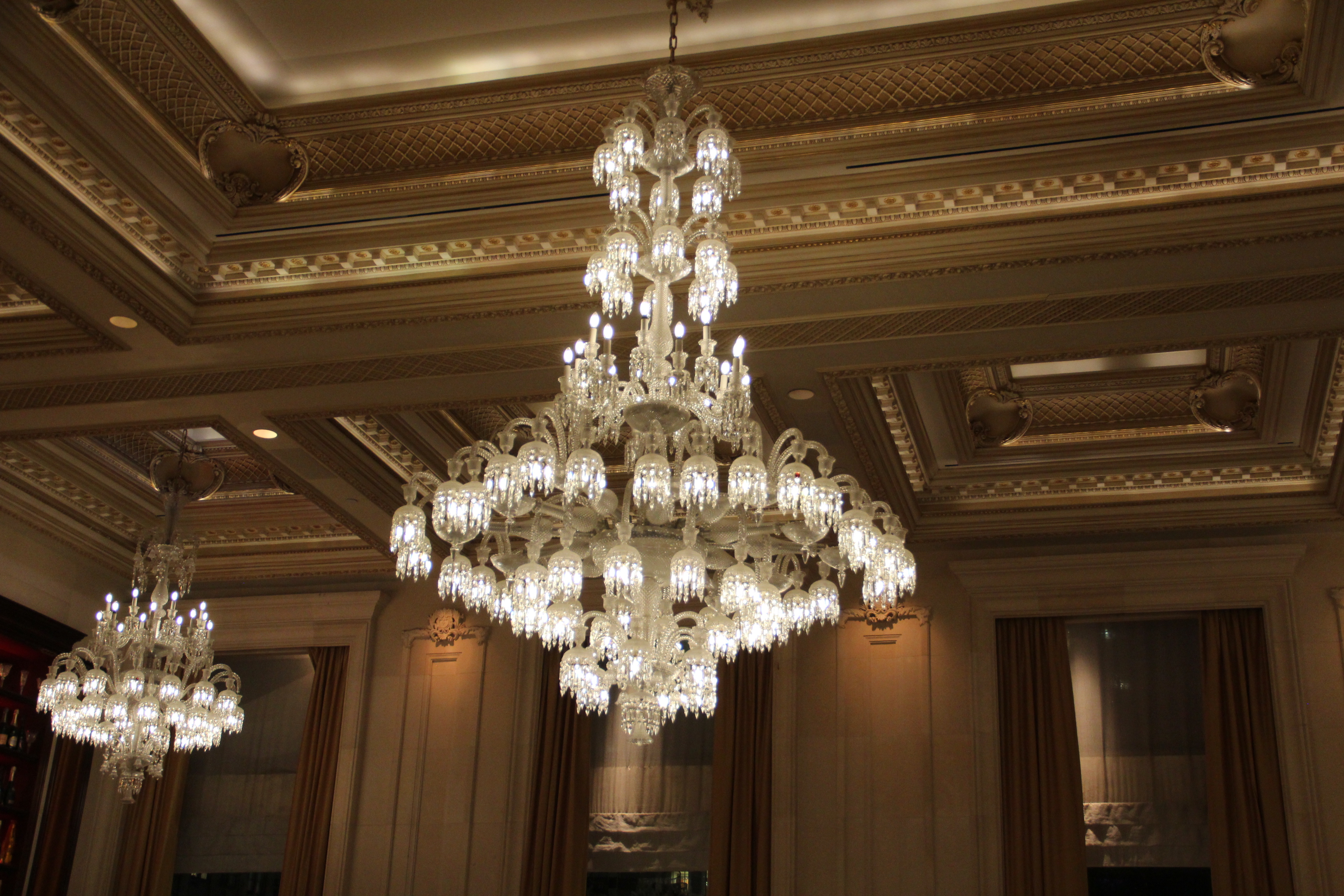
A chandelier in one of the Plaza Hotel's restaurants

The Palm Court, previously known as the tea room, is in the center of the ground floor. Its design was inspired by the Palm Court at the Carlton Hotel in London. The space has Caen stone and Breche Violette walls, mosaic floors, and marble pilasters and columns with bronze capitals. Tropical plants, rubber trees, and palms gave the room a garden-like ambiance. The Palm Court initially had a stained glass ceiling, which was removed in a 1940s renovation; it was restored in the mid-2000s. There were also mirrors on the western wall, against which are four caryatids carved by Pottier & Stymus, which frame the wall mirrors and represent the seasons. The Palm Court was renovated in 2014; its modern design includes four palm trees as well as a central marble-and-brass bar. East of the Palm Court, separated from it by the main corridor, were once the Plaza Restaurant and the Champagne Porch. The Palm Court and Plaza Restaurant, which shared nearly identical designs, originally formed a "vast dining hall". Removable glass panes along the main corridor abutted both spaces.

The Terrace Room, west of the Palm Court, is part of Warren and Wetmore's 1921 design and is named because it contains three terraces. The terrace increases in height from east to west and divide the room into three sections, which are separated by balustrades and connected by small staircases. The space contains Renaissance-style motifs on the pilasters, ceilings, and wall arches, as well as three chandeliers and rusticated-marble walls. John B. Smeraldi was commissioned to paint the Terrace Room's ornamentation. The room is surrounded by a balcony, with a painted coffer ceiling possibly commissioned by Smeraldi, as well as marble pilasters and floors. A balcony runs slightly above the room on its southern wall. Immediately south of the balcony is the Terrace Room's corridor and foyer.

The southeastern corner of the ground floor originally contained the 58th Street Restaurant, which was exclusively for the hotel's long-term residents. In 1934, it was replaced by a nightclub called the Persian Room, which had red and Persian-blue upholstery by Joseph Urban, five wall murals by Lillian Gaertner Palmedo, and a 27 ft (8.2 m) bar. The room operated until 1978.

==== Ballroom ====
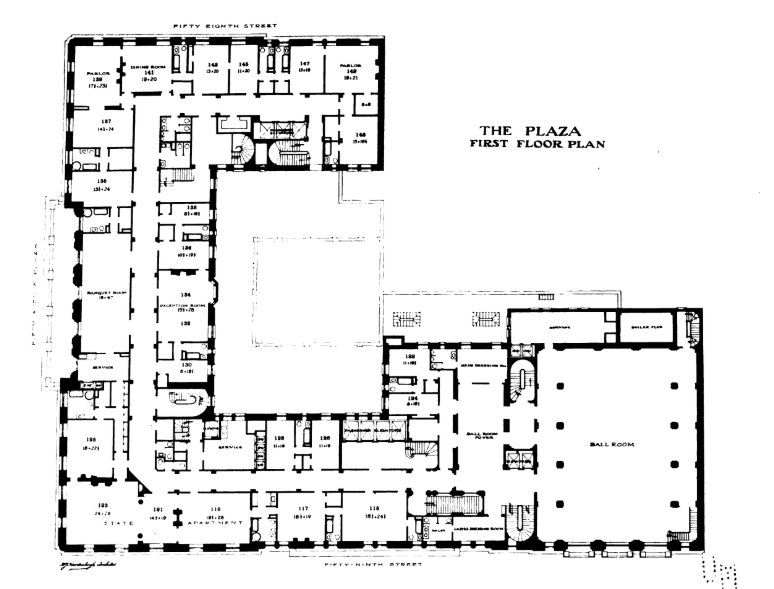
Original plan of floor 1 (physically the second story), which is one story above ground level. The top of this diagram faces south. The current ballroom, not shown, would be built in the space at the top right of this diagram.

The original double-height ballroom from Hardenbergh's plan was on the north side of the second story, or floor 1 according to the Plaza Hotel's floor numbering system. The old ballroom, with a capacity of 500 to 600 people, was served by its own elevator and staircase, and contained a movable stage. The old ballroom was overlooked on three sides by balconies, and contained a white-and-cream color scheme similar to the current ballroom. It was served by its own entrance on 58th Street. By the 1970s, the old ballroom was replaced by offices.

The current ballroom on floor 1 is at the center of that story. It was initially designed by Warren and Wetmore, and had a capacity of 800 people for dinners and 1,000 people for dances. The room contained a coved ceiling designed by Smeraldi, with crosses, hexagons, and octagons, as well as six chandeliers. The ballroom had a stage on its western wall, within a rectangular opening. A balcony ran across the three other walls and was supported by pilasters with bronze capitals.

In 1929, Warren and Wetmore's ballroom was reconstructed according to a neoclassical design by Schultze & Weaver. The room has a white-and-cream color scheme with gold ornamentation, evocative of the original ballroom's design. The stage remains on the western wall, but is within a rounded opening. The redesign added audience boxes, with decorative metal railings, on the north and east walls. The ballroom contains a coved ceiling with roundels, lunettes, bas reliefs, and two chandeliers. South of the ballroom proper is a corridor running west to east. The corridor has a decorative barrel-vaulted paneled ceiling and had a balcony that was removed during the 1929 redesign. On the southernmost section of floor 1 is the ballroom foyer and the stair hall, two formerly separate rooms that were combined in 1965 to form a neoclassical marble-clad space. The stair hall contains the stairs leading from the mezzanine foyer.

==== Condominiums and suites ====
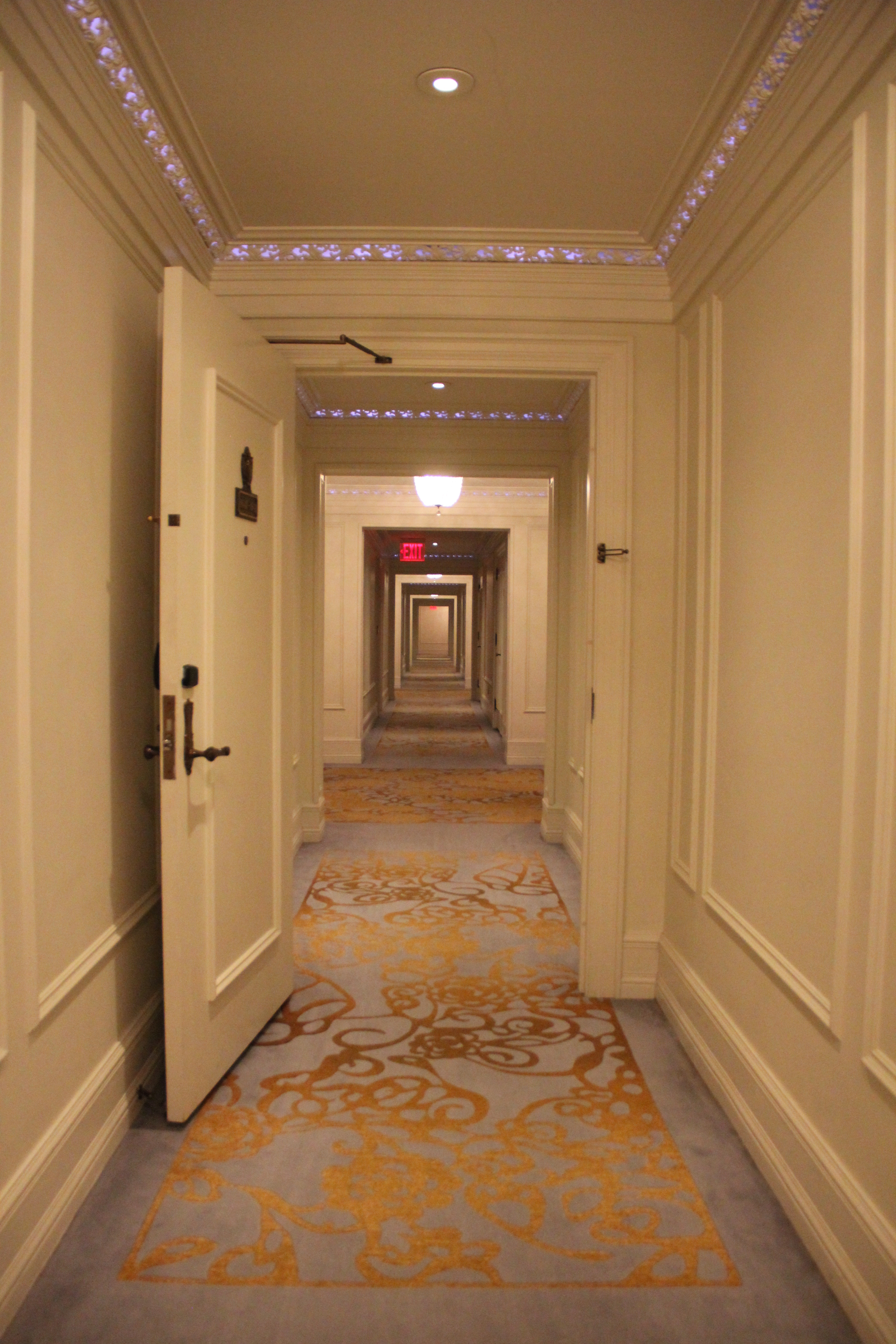
Suite hallway

The Plaza Hotel's condominiums and suites start on the third story, labeled as floor 2. As originally built, they contained three primary types of suites: those with one bedroom and one bathroom; those with two bedrooms and two bathrooms; and those with a parlor and varying numbers of bedrooms and bathrooms. The walls were originally painted in rose, yellow, cream, and gray hues. No wallpaper was used in the rooms, which were instead finished in plain plaster. For decorative effect, the rooms contained wooden wainscoting and furniture, while the plaster ceilings supported crystal chandeliers. A guest or resident could request multiple suites, since there were smaller private hallways adjacent to the main hallway on each floor. There were also staff rooms at the corners of the main corridor on each floor. Dumbwaiters led from the staff rooms to the basement kitchen, allowing guests to order meals and eat them in-suite. In each room were three buttons, which guests could use to contact that floor's staff, the maid, or the bellhop.

Following its 2008 renovation, the building contains 181 privately owned condominiums, which are marketed as the Plaza Residences or One Central Park South. The condominiums are on the north and east sides of the building and have a variety of layouts, from studio apartments to three-story penthouse units. The condos' interiors include parquet floors and stone counters, and largely reflect the original design of these rooms. There are also 282 hotel units on the southern side of the building. Of these, 152 condo-hotel units occupy the eleventh through twenty-first stories, respectively labeled as floors 10 through 20. The condo-hotel units serve as residences for investors or staff for up to four months a year, and are used as short-term hotel units for the remaining time. In addition, there are 130 rooms exclusively for short-term stays on the fourth through tenth stories, respectively labeled as floors 3 through 9. The hotel portion of the building retains a butler on each floor, reminiscent of the hotel's original opulence.

Hardenbergh's design included the State Apartment on the northern side of floor 1. This apartment was one of the most lavish suites in the entire hotel; it had a drawing room, antechambers, dining rooms, bedrooms and bathrooms, and food storage. Also on floor 1 were private banquet, reception, and card rooms. The apartment was turned into a private dining area and restored in 1974. Similarly ornate suites were located along the Central Park South side on eleven of the upper floors. The twenty-first story (labeled as floor 20) was created as part of the 2008 renovation, and is part of a four-bedroom penthouse, the largest condominium in the building.

In the early- and mid-20th century, several designers, such as Elsie de Wolfe and Cecil Beaton, were hired to design special suites for the hotel, which has also offered suites or experiences that are themed to notable books or films set there. During 2013, a 900-square-foot (84 m^{2}) suite on the 18th floor of the hotel was furnished with various decorations from the movie The Great Gatsby. The furnished room was based on the novel of the same name by F. Scott Fitzgerald, which had several scenes set at the hotel (see § In media). During 2017 and 2018, the Plaza Hotel sold vacation packages with memorabilia, photo opportunities, an in-suite ice cream sundae, and visits to New York City tourist attractions based on the film Home Alone 2: Lost in New York, which is partially set in the hotel. Another room in the hotel was redecorated in 2022 to promote the TV series The Marvelous Mrs. Maisel.

== History ==
The land lots making up the site of the present-day Plaza Hotel were first parceled and sold by the government of New York City in 1853, and acquired by John Anderson from 1870 to 1881. Prior to the Plaza Hotel's development, the site was occupied either by the New York Skating Club, or was vacant. When John Anderson died in 1881, his will stipulated that his land would pass to his son, John Charles Anderson. The first development on the site was proposed in 1882, when Ernest Flagg was enlisted to design a 12-story apartment building for a syndicate led by his father, Jared. However, the Flagg apartment development was not built, likely due to a lack of funding.

=== First hotel ===
John Duncan Phyfe and James Campbell acquired the site in 1883. Phyfe and Campbell announced plans for a nine-story apartment building at the site in October of that year, to be designed by Carl Pfeiffer; and construction on the apartment block began that same year. The builders borrowed over $800,000 from the New York Life Insurance Company, and obtained a second mortgage from John Charles Anderson for a total investment of $2 million. (Note: New York Life's investment is equivalent to $25.17 million, and the total investment is equivalent to $62.92 million in 2025.) By 1887, after taking three loans from New York Life, Phyfe and Campbell found that they did not have enough funds to complete the apartment block. The extent to which the apartment building was completed before the builders' bankruptcy is unclear. (Note: The 1885 E. Robinson Atlas shows the "Fifth Avenue Plaza Hotel" as occupying part of the site, without indicating its construction status and The New York Times of February 28, 1888, describes the hotel's interior as being partially furnished. Although architectural writer Robert A. M. Stern implies that only the foundations were completed, the building had progressed several stories above ground by 1886, when a worker died after falling seven stories from the structure.)

In February 1888, brothers Eugene M. and Frank Earle entered into a contract to lease the hotel from Phyfe and Campbell and to furnish it. New York Life concurrently foreclosed on the apartment building and that September bought it at public auction for $925,000. Shortly afterward, New York Life decided to remodel the interiors completely, hiring architects McKim, Mead & White to complete the hotel. New York Life leased the hotel to Frederick A. Hammond in 1889, and the Hammond brothers became the operators of the hotel for the next fifteen years.

The first Plaza Hotel finally opened on October 1, 1890, at a cost of $3 million. (Note: Equivalent to $97.96 million in 2025) The original hotel stood eight stories tall and had 400 rooms. The interiors featured extensive mahogany and carved-wood furnishings; lion motifs, representing the hotel's coat of arms; and a 30-foot-tall (9.1 m) dining room with stained glass windows and gold and white decorations. Moses King, in his 1893 Handbook of New York City, characterized the hotel as "one of the most attractive public houses in the wide world". Despite being described as fashionable, it was not profitable. The New York Times reported in 1891 that the hotel netted $72,000 in rental income, against the $1.8 million that New York Life had spent to complete the hotel, including loans to Phyfe and Campbell. (Note: The rental income is equivalent to $2.33 million, and the total investment is equivalent to $58.19 million in 2025.)

=== Redeveloped hotel in the early 20th century ===
The first Plaza Hotel had been relatively remote when it was completed, but by the first decade of the 20th century was part of a rapidly growing commercial district on Fifth Avenue. Furthermore, several upscale hotels in Manhattan were also being rebuilt during that time. In May 1902, a syndicate purchased the Plaza and three adjacent lots on Central Park South for $3 million. (Note: The syndicate was composed of the Central Realty, Bond and Trust Company; Hallgarten and Company; and the George A. Fuller Company.) The sale was the largest-ever cash-only purchase for a Manhattan property at the time. The purchasers were headed by Harry S. Black—who headed the George A. Fuller Company, one of the syndicate's members—as well as German financier Bernhard Beinecke.

Shortly after the purchase, Black and Beinecke formed the Plaza Realty Company to redevelop the hotel. In mid-1905, Black also formed the United States Realty and Construction Company, a trust whose subsidiaries included the Fuller Company and the Plaza Realty Company. Sources disagree on whether Black and Beinecke approached barbed-wire entrepreneur John Warne Gates directly for funding, or whether Gates overheard Black and Beinecke discuss their redevelopment plans at a restaurant. In either case, Gates agreed to fund the project on the condition that Frederic Sterry be named the Plaza's managing director. To entice Sterry to join the hotel's staff, Black and Beinecke wanted to make a grand hotel.

==== Construction ====
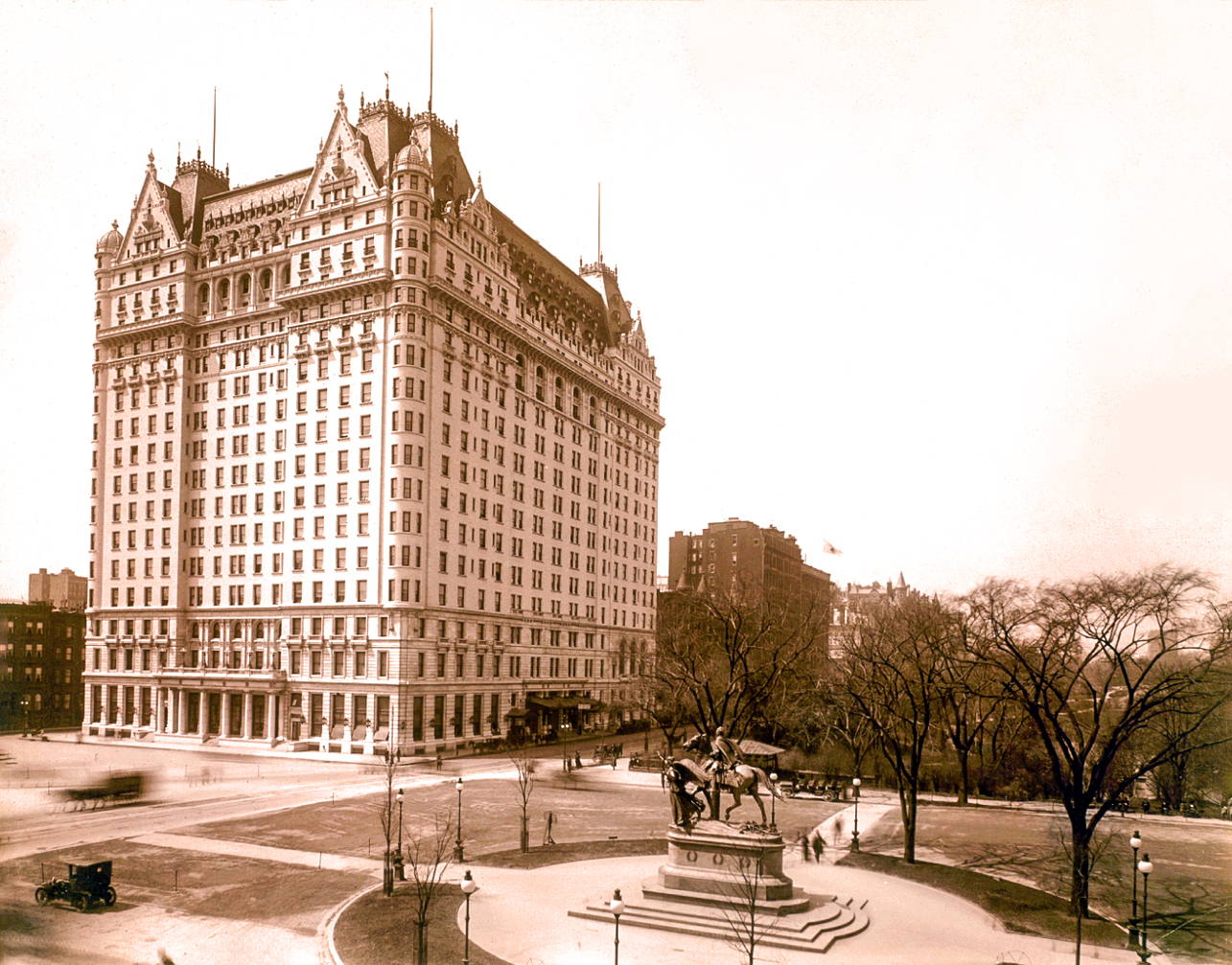
The rebuilt Plaza Hotel during the early 20th century

Henry J. Hardenbergh was hired as architect in 1905, initially being commissioned to expand the existing hotel by five stories. Hardenbergh had already gained some renown for designing other upscale hotels, such as the Waldorf Astoria Hotel, twenty-five blocks south, during the 1890s. Beinecke, Black, and Gates subsequently discovered that the foundation of the existing hotel could not support the additional stories, so they decided to rebuild it completely. The George A. Fuller Company was contracted to construct the new hotel. Hardenbergh designed the new hotel building while the owners waited for the existing lease to expire. His design took advantage of the fact that the site faced Grand Army Plaza and could thus be seen from many angles.

The first Plaza Hotel was closed on June 11, 1905, and demolition commenced immediately upon the expiration of the lease there. The existing hotel's furnishings were auctioned. The site was cleared within two months of the start of demolition. Hardenbergh filed plans for the hotel with the New York City Department of Buildings that September. By the next month, contractors were clearing the old hotel's foundation. The new hotel was to use 10,000 short tons (8,900 long tons; 9,100 t) of steel, and a group of 100 workers and seven derricks erected two stories of steelwork every six days. The Fuller Company decided to hire both union and non-union ironworkers for the hotel's construction, a decision that angered the union workers. (Note: Satow 2019, chapter 1, states that union workers were hired for high-skill jobs, but required higher wages. Non-union workers were hired for low-skill jobs and could be paid lower wages.) Patrolmen were hired to protect the non-union workers, and one patrolmen was killed during a dispute with union workers. By October 1906, the facade of the new hotel was under construction.

Hardenbergh and Sterry directed several firms to furnish the interior spaces. Sterry recalled that all of the interior features were custom-designed for the hotel, such as 1,650 crystal chandeliers and the largest-ever order of gold-rimmed cutlery. Much of the furniture was manufactured by the Pooley Company of Philadelphia; where the Pooley Company could not manufacture the furnishings, the Plaza's developers chartered ships to import material from Europe. Sterry himself was dispatched to Europe to purchase these materials. The developers originally anticipated that the hotel would cost $8.5 million to construct, including the furnishings. (Note: Equivalent to $214.13 million in 2025) Shortly after work started, the developers determined that they would need to raise another $4 million, (Note: Equivalent to $100.77 million in 2025) and the additional expenditures pushed the final construction cost to $12.5 million. To pay for the construction costs, the developers received a $5 million loan in mid-1906, followed by another $4.5 million loan in 1907.

==== Opening and expansion ====
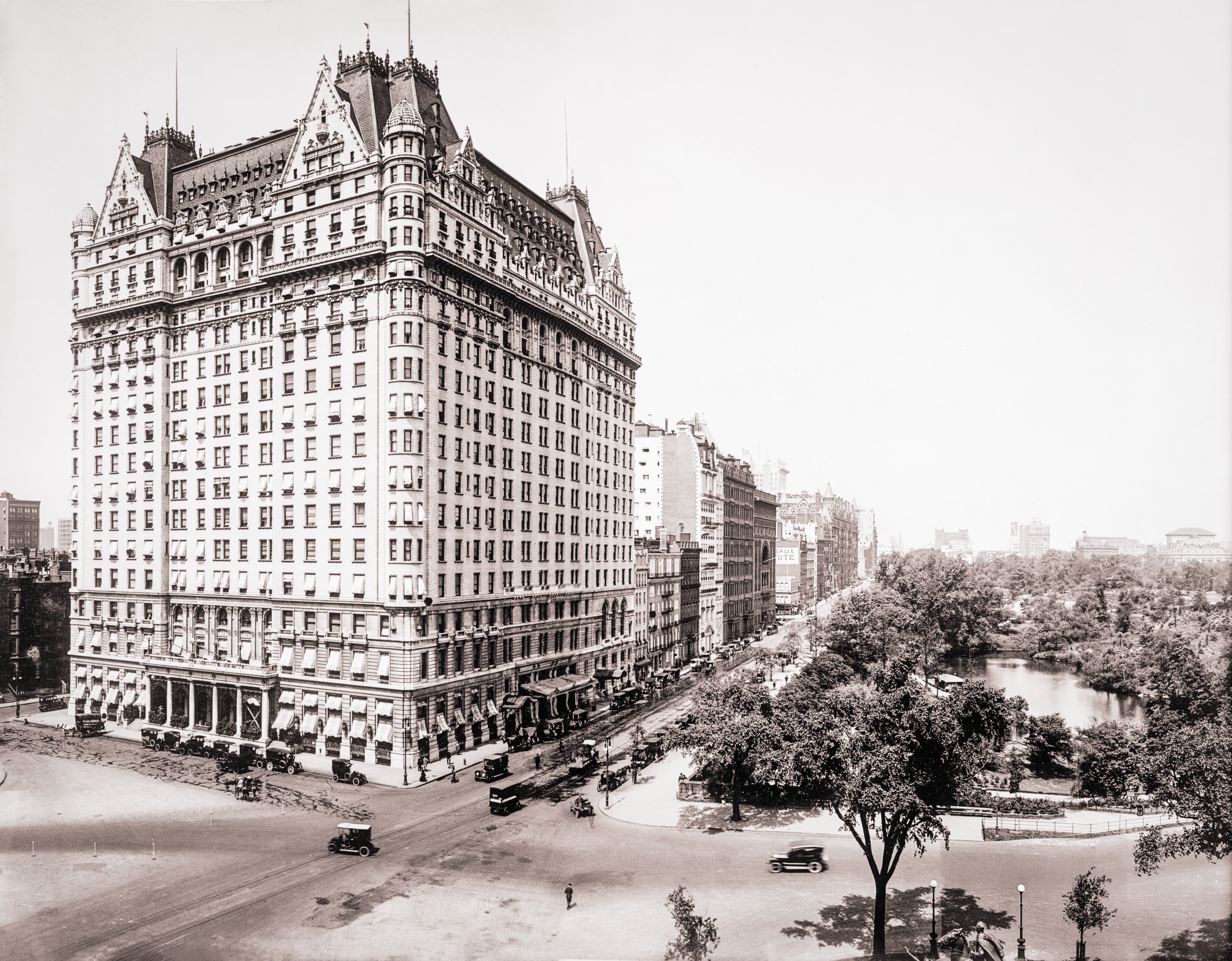
The hotel as seen c. 1910

The new 800-room Plaza Hotel was opened on October 1, 1907, twenty-seven months after work had commenced. The opening was attended by people such as businessman Diamond Jim Brady; actresses Lillian Russell, Billie Burke, Maxine Elliott, and Fritzi Scheff; producers David Belasco and Oscar Hammerstein I; actor John Drew Jr.; and author Mark Twain. Though the opening coincided with the Panic of 1907, the hotel suffered minimal losses. The new hotel more than doubled the capacity of the first structure, and it was intended as a largely residential hotel at opening, although the terms for "hotel" and "apartment" were largely synonymous at the time. Estimates held that ninety percent of the units were for long-term residents. The owners charged short-term guests $2.50 nightly. (Note: Equivalent to $86.38 in 2025 (Note: 1634–1699: McCusker, J. J. (1997). How Much Is That in Real Money? A Historical Price Index for Use as a Deflator of Money Values in the Economy of the United States: Addenda et Corrigenda (PDF). American Antiquarian Society. 1700–1799: McCusker, J. J. (1992). How Much Is That in Real Money? A Historical Price Index for Use as a Deflator of Money Values in the Economy of the United States (PDF). American Antiquarian Society. 1800–present: Federal Reserve Bank of Minneapolis. "Consumer Price Index (estimate) 1800–".)) In addition to the apartments, there were 500 bathrooms, ten elevators, a myriad of marble staircases, and two floors of public rooms. Gates, one of the original investors, was among the residents of the new Plaza; when he died in 1911, his funeral was held at the hotel.

Most of the public rooms were not originally given formal names. Although Hardenbergh had predicted that gender-segregated spaces were going out of fashion, there was a women's reception room near 58th Street; and the bar room and men's grill (respectively the present Oak and Edwardian Rooms) were exclusively used by men. In practice, the men's grill acted as a social club where discussing business was socially inappropriate, while the bar was a space to talk business. Sometime between 1912 and the start of Prohibition in the United States in 1920, the brokerage office near the entrance, now the Oak Bar, was turned into an extension of the bar room. The Champagne Porch along Grand Army Plaza was the most exclusive area of the hotel, with meals costing between $50 and $500. (Note: Equivalent to between $1,728 and $17,277 in 2025) The basement's grill room hosted ice-skating in the summer, as well as a "dog check room" where residents' dogs could be fed luxuriously. In its first decade, the Plaza employed a staff of over 1,500.

From the start, the Plaza Operating Company was already preparing for the possibility of expansion, and it acquired the lots between 5 and 19 West 58th Street in the first two decades of the 20th century. This land acquisition commenced before the second hotel had even opened. By 1915, the Plaza Operating Company had acquired four lots on West 58th Street and one on Central Park South, and it received an exemption from the 1916 Zoning Resolution, which set height restrictions for new buildings on the 58th Street side of the lots. The company filed plans for a 19-story annex along 58th Street in August 1919, to be designed by Warren and Wetmore. The final lots, at 15 and 17 West 58th Street, were acquired in 1920 after the plans had been filed. The George A. Fuller Company was again hired as the builder. To fund the construction of the annex, the Plaza Operating Company took out mortgage loans worth $2.275 million.

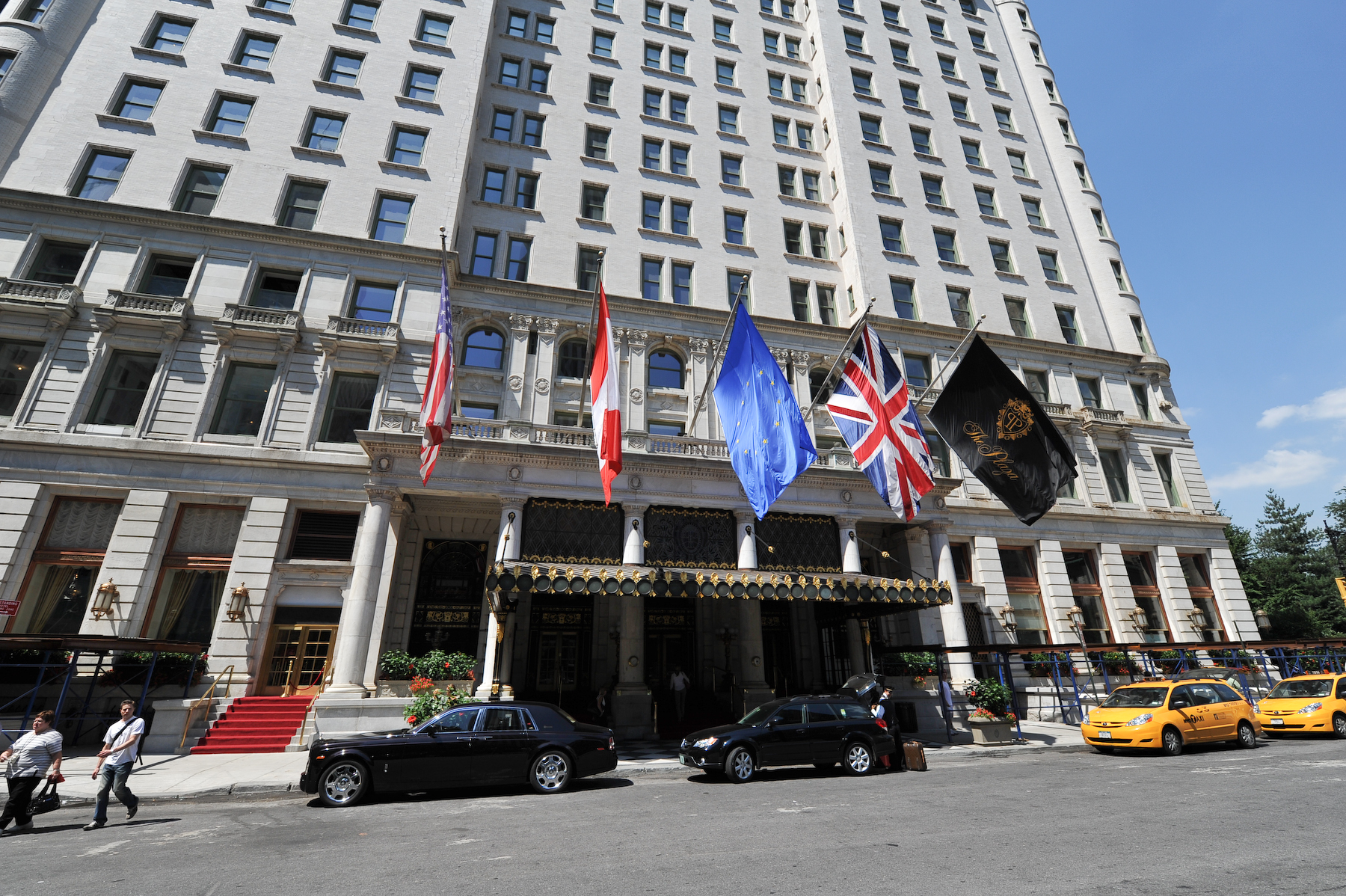
The main entrance was moved to Grand Army Plaza (pictured) as a result of the 1921 expansion by Warren and Wetmore.

The Champagne Porch was only frequented by the extremely wealthy; and in 1921, after the start of Prohibition, Sterry decided to remove the room altogether. An enlarged entrance took its place. The work also included building a new restaurant called the Terrace Room, as well as a ballroom and 350 additional suites. Warren and Wetmore designed the expanded interior with more subtle contrasts in the decor, compared to Hardenbergh's design. The annex opened October 14, 1921, with an event in the ballroom, but was not officially completed until April 1922. With the advent of Prohibition, the bar room was also closed, and the gender segregation rule was relaxed. The space occupied by the present-day Oak Bar became the offices of brokerage EF Hutton. The Plaza had become the city's most valuable hotel by 1923, and contributed to the parent U.S. Realty Company being highly profitable and paying increasingly high dividends during the 1920s.

==== Great Depression ====
For unknown reasons, Warren and Wetmore's ballroom was reconstructed from June to September 1929, based on neoclassical designs by Schultze & Weaver. Shortly afterward, U.S. Realty's stock price collapsed in the Wall Street Crash of October 1929, which commenced the Great Depression in the United States. Plaza Hotel co-owner Harry Black killed himself the following year, and his partner Bernhard Beinecke died two years later. The rebuilt Plaza's first manager, Fred Sterry, died in 1933. The early 1930s were also financially difficult for the Plaza Hotel, as only half of the suites were occupied by 1932. To reduce operating costs for the hotel's restaurants, the grill room in the basement was converted into a closet, while the Rose Room became an automobile showroom. The furnishings of the hotel fell into disrepair; and during some months management was unable to pay staff.

By the mid-1930s, the old tea room was officially known as the Palm Court, having been frequently referred to as the "Palm Room" during the previous decade. The back room was reopened as the Oak Room restaurant in 1934, although it was still referred to as the "back room" by its frequent visitors, which included bankers and brokers. The same year, the Fifth Avenue lobby received display windows and a doorway on the southern wall; and the southeastern corner of the ground floor was remodeled into the Persian Room.

=== Mid-20th century ===
==== Hilton operation ====
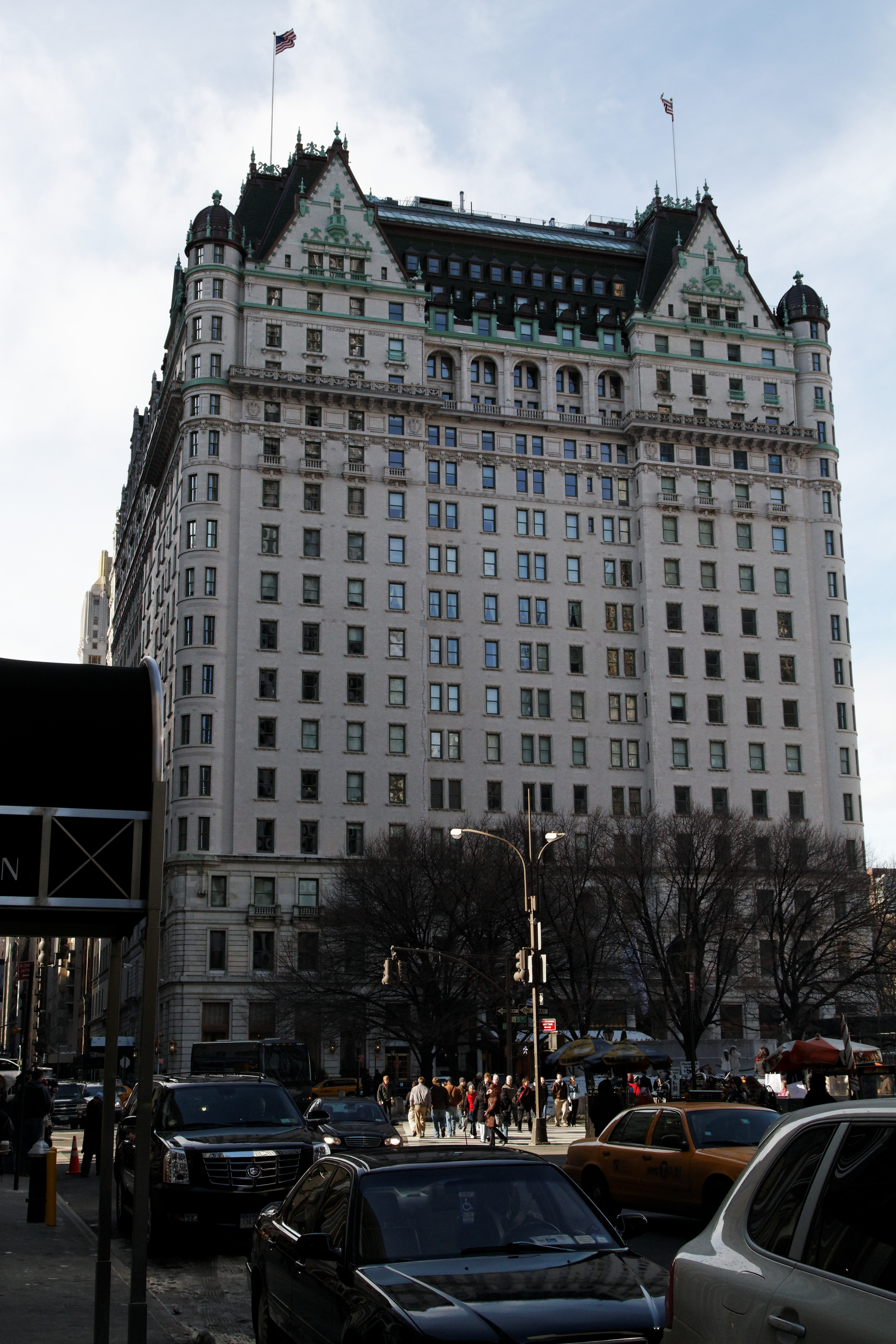
Seen from the east on 58th Street

U.S. Realty continued to lose money through the 1930s, and started selling off its properties, including the Plaza Hotel. In October 1943, Atlas Corporation, collaborating with hotelier Conrad Hilton, bought the Plaza Hotel for $7.4 million. (Note: Equivalent to $109.96 million in 2025) At the time, the Plaza was 61 percent occupied, and many public areas were closed due to supply shortages caused by World War II. Hilton subsequently spent $6 million refurbishing the hotel. (Note: Equivalent to $89.16 million in 2025) During mid-1944, the lobby on Fifth Avenue was renovated and its mezzanine was enclosed. The Palm Court skylight, having fallen into disrepair, was removed for the installation of air conditioning equipment. A mezzanine was also built above the hotel's former courtyard, and the room itself became the Court Lounge. The brokerage office at the ground level's northwestern corner was turned into the Oak Bar, which opened in January 1945; and EF Hutton was relegated to the Fifth Avenue lobby's mezzanine. The contractor for the renovations may have been Frederick P. Platt & Brother, which was the Plaza Hotel's primary contractor in the 1940s.

The Plaza Hotel Corporation, the hotel's operator, was merged with the Hilton Hotels Corporation in 1946. The following year, the Plaza Rendez-Vous opened within the old grill room space. By the early 1950s, women were allowed inside the Oak Room and Bar during evenings and in the summer. The Oak Room and Bar was still a men-only space before 3 p.m., while the stock exchanges were open.

Hilton sold the hotel in 1953 to Boston industrialist A.M. "Sonny" Sonnabend for $15 million, (Note: Equivalent to $143.95 million in 2025) and immediately leased it back for 2.5 years. Sonnabend became president of national restaurant chain Childs Company in 1955, and Childs purchased the Plaza that November for $6.2 million in stock. (Note: Equivalent to $58.07 million in 2025) The same year, the ground-floor Plaza Restaurant was renamed the Edwardian Room. James S. Graham Jr. simultaneously renovated the State Apartment, and air conditioning was installed in each guest room. Childs became the Hotel Corporation of America (HCA) in 1956, and Hilton's lease was renewed indefinitely that year. HCA sold the Plaza to Lawrence Wien in November 1958 for $21 million (Note: Equivalent to $179 million in 2025) and immediately leased it back for 25 years. The transaction included curtailing Hilton's lease to April 1960, at which time HCA assumed the operating lease.

==== Sonnabend operation ====
The Plaza Hotel experienced financial difficulties during the early 1960s; but under Sonnabend's management, the Plaza's financial outlook improved by 1964. The facade of the hotel was cleaned in late 1960, the first time that the exterior had been fully cleaned since its construction. This was followed, in 1962, by extensive exterior and interior renovations, which resulted in the redecoration of many of the suites and public rooms. Four of the hotel's hydraulic elevators were replaced with electric elevators in 1964, including the three elevators in the 58th Street lobby. A second phase of renovations was announced the same year, which entailed enlarging some public rooms and replacing the ground-floor barber shop with a Trader Vic's bar. The ballroom's foyer and stair hall were combined during this renovation, which was completed by 1965, having cost $9 million. (Note: Equivalent to $70.06 million in 2025)

Upon Sonny Sonnabend's death in 1964, his son Roger took over the hotel. Further changes to the hotel's ownership occurred the next year, when Sol Goldman and Alexander DiLorenzo's firm, Wellington Associates, bought an option to obtain a half-interest in the underlying land from Hilton. The policy of allowing only men to have lunch at the Oak Room was ended in 1969. In 1971, HCA, by then renamed Sonesta Hotels, announced another round of renovations. This included the redecoration of the Grand Ballroom, as well as the replacement of the Edwardian Room with a restaurant called the Green Tulip, whose pink, lime, and brown design by Sally Dryden received a largely negative reception from the public. The ballroom was also renovated at this time.

The renovations coincided with a decline in Sonesta's and the Plaza's finances, with the hotel recording negative net income in 1971. Sonesta repurchased the Plaza Hotel from Wien in 1972. Shortly afterward, Sonesta looked to sell its interest in the hotel to Harry Helmsley, and Wellington attempted to take over Sonesta by buying its shares. Both the sale and the attempted Sonesta takeover were unsuccessful; and Wellington made an offer for Sonesta's share of the hotel in April 1974, which Sonesta refused.

=== Late 20th century ===
==== Westin ownership ====
In November 1974, Western International Hotels announced its intention to buy the Plaza Hotel from Sonesta for $25 million. (Note: Equivalent to $126.8 million in 2025) The same year, the Edwardian Room was largely restored according to designs by Charles Winslow, and was rebranded as the Plaza Suite. Following Western International's acquisition of the Plaza, it renovated the interior spaces, cleaned the exterior, and restored much of the hotel according to the original designs, at a total cost of $200 million. (Note: Equivalent to $1014.39 million in 2025) The four hydraulic elevators serving the Central Park South lobby, among the last of their type in the city, were replaced with electric elevators in 1976. Westin also bought the Shinn murals that year for $1 million; they had not been part of the original sale. The Rambusch Company was hired to restore the Oak Room and Bar. The next year, a 204-seat theater called Cinema 3 opened in the basement. The Persian Room was closed in 1978, and a clothing boutique opened in its place. Westin had planned to restore the Palm Court's skylight, but this did not happen.

By the late 1970s, the Plaza Hotel was again making a net profit. Western International changed its name to Westin Hotels in 1981; the hotel was renamed soon after, becoming The Westin Plaza. However, Westin started to lose money in the late 1980s. By 1987, Westin's parent company Allegis Corporation announced its intent to sell the Plaza, generating interest from at least 150 investors. The Plaza, along with the rest of the Westin chain, was transferred to the Aoki Corporation and Robert M. Bass in January 1988. Shortly afterward, Philip Pilevsky and Arthur G. Cohen expressed their intent to buy the Plaza and turn it into a hotel-cooperative.

==== Trump ownership ====
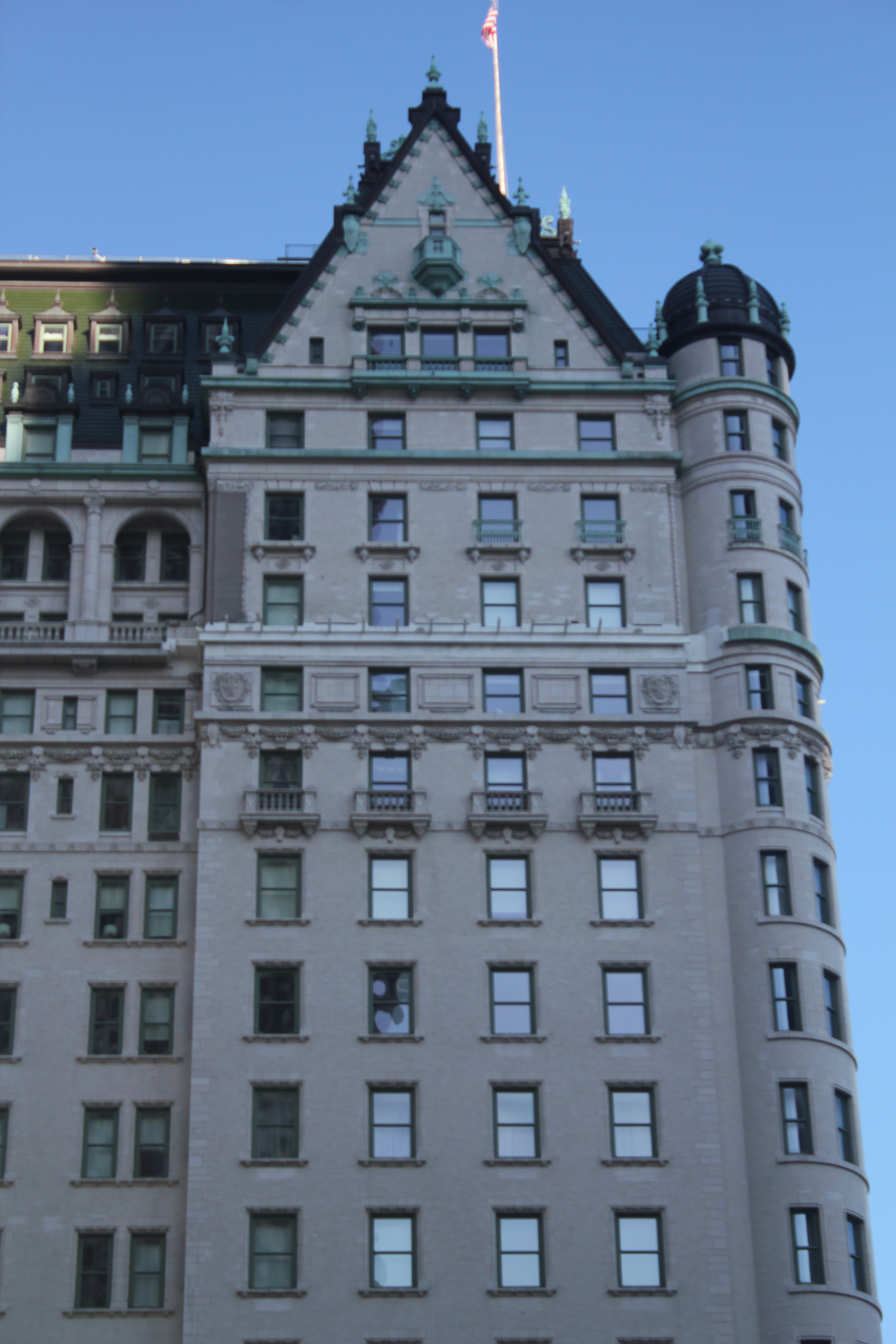
The northern portion of the eastern facade

In March 1988, real estate developer Donald Trump bought the Plaza using a $407 million loan from several banks. After gaining title to the hotel in July, Trump put his wife Ivana in charge of renovating and managing the hotel. The Trumps subsequently announced a major renovation program, which entailed restoring the lobby and some of the other interior elements. The work also involved gilding many surfaces, replacing carpets, and reupholstering furniture. Trump also decided to shut down the Trader Vic's in the basement in 1989, saying it had become "tacky". The hotel made a modest profit for about two years after Trump's purchase, largely from increased occupancy, suite rates, and banquet bookings.

Trump had borrowed extensively to purchase the Plaza, but the hotel's operating income was several million dollars below the breakeven point. As a result, the hotel's debt ultimately grew to $600 million. By 1991, Trump was making plans to pay off the hotel's debt by selling off the vast majority of its units as condominiums. Trump estimated that the conversion would net $750 million, almost twice the purchase price. Trump also considered converting the offices under the mansard roof to penthouse condos, according to designs by Lee Harris Pomeroy. The conversion plan failed because it would have been unprofitable, due to a then-recent drop-off in prices in the city's real estate market. In March 1992, as a last resort, Trump approached the Plaza's creditors, a group of seventy banks led by Citibank, who agreed to take a 49% stake in the hotel in exchange for forgiveness of $250 million in debt and an interest-rate reduction. The agreement was submitted as a prepackaged bankruptcy in November 1992 and approved the next month.

==== Kwek and Al-Waleed ownership ====
By 1994, Trump was looking to sell the Plaza before Citibank and other creditors could find a buyer, which would have wiped out his investment. One of his executives identified Hong Kong–based Sun Hung Kai Properties as a potential buyer. The deal fell through after the family of Sun Hung Kai executive Walter Kwok got trapped behind a jammed door while touring the Plaza Hotel. Trump, attempting to maintain appearances, threatened to sue the New York Post that December for reporting that the Sultan of Brunei, Hassanal Bolkiah, had made an offer for the hotel. Meanwhile, the creditors had also identified Singaporean developer Kwek Leng Beng as a likely buyer. Kwek's company, Singaporean chain City Developments Limited (CDL), offered to take over the creditors' ownership stake. Saudi prince Al-Waleed bin Talal was also interested in buying the Plaza; and by March 1995, Al-Waleed and CDL had raised $325 million for a controlling stake. Trump unsuccessfully petitioned Kwek to partner with him instead of Al-Waleed.

Trump sold the controlling stake to Kwek and Al-Waleed in April 1995. As part of the transaction, the hotel's debt was reduced to $25 million. Kwek and Al-Waleed each bought a 42 percent stake, and Citibank received the other 16 percent stake, a move intended to prevent Trump from intervening in the sale. The partnership also agreed that, if the mansard penthouses were ever created, some of the profits would be shared with Trump. In 1997, Hong Kong developer Great Eagle Holdings agreed to buy half of Al-Waleed's stake in the Plaza Hotel. That same year, Sheila Connors became the first female doorperson at the hotel. DiLorenzo International renovated the ballroom in the mid-1990s, and Adam Tihany refurbished the Edwardian Room prior to 2001. The Plaza was highly profitable in the late 1990s, with operating income of almost $46 million at the end of that decade.

=== 21st century ===
==== El Ad ownership ====
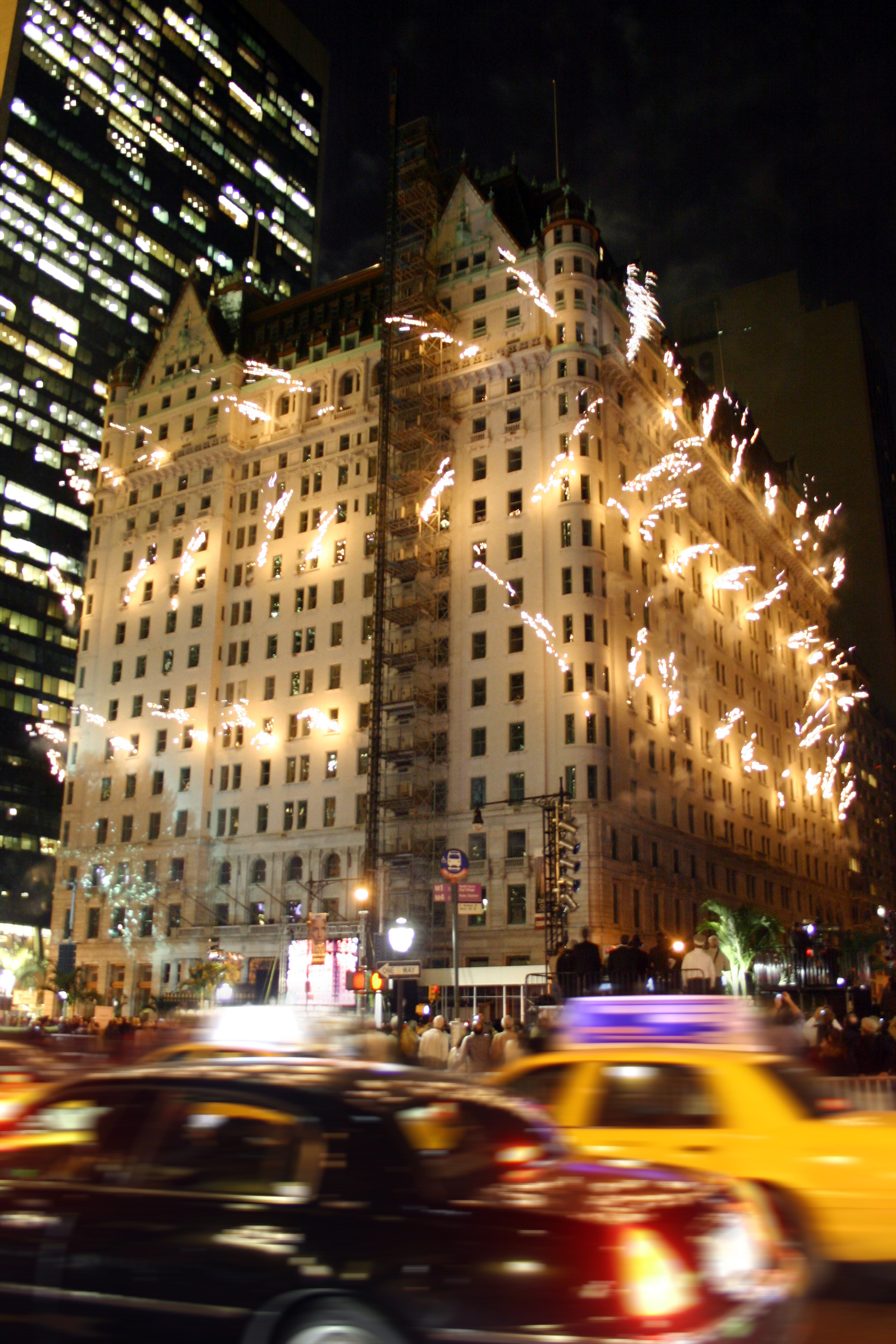
The Plaza Hotel turned 100 years old in October 2007, celebrating with ceremonies and fireworks.

The September 11 attacks in 2001 resulted in a downturn in the New York City tourism industry. Correspondingly, the Plaza's operating profits decreased greatly, leaving Kwek and Al-Waleed unable to refurbish the Plaza as they had previously planned to do. In 2004, they sold the Plaza Hotel for $675 million to El Ad Properties, run by developer Yitzhak Tshuva. El Ad wished to add residential and commercial units, but initially faced pushback from hotel unions and preservationists, who opposed El Ad's plan to remove most of the hotel rooms and convert the restaurant spaces to stores. In particular, preservationists opposed the conversion of the ballroom into commercial space, even though no changes to the ballroom's architecture were planned, because part of the ballroom occupied a site that was zoned for residential use only. After over sixty hours of discussions between El Ad and the hotel unions, they came to an agreement on April 14, 2005, under which El Ad would convert fewer units to apartments, while preserving more of the hotel suites.

The Plaza Hotel temporarily closed for a $450 million renovation on April 30, 2005, two weeks after the agreement had been brokered. Fairmont Hotels and Resorts took over operation of the hotel portion during late 2005. The Plaza's furnishings were auctioned on-site and at a Christie's auction in 2006. During the renovation, most of the short-term hotel rooms were converted into residential units, and the Palm Court's stained glass ceiling was restored. In addition, floors 18 and 19 were extended toward the interior courtyard, while a small floor 20 was created above the existing roof.

The hotel reopened on March 1, 2008. Though the real-estate market in general had slowed down due to the 2008 financial crisis, apartments at the Plaza Hotel were being sold for millions of dollars, disproportionately impacting average apartment prices in Manhattan. The hotel unveiled its retail collection, an underground mall featuring luxury brands, in November 2008. Initially, the Plaza sought to attract foreign companies, since many American luxury brands already rented space nearby or sold goods in the neighboring Bergdorf Goodman Building. The Plaza Food Hall opened in the underground mall in 2010, anchored by the Todd English Food Hall in collaboration with chef Todd English. By then, El Ad was struggling to find tenants for the mall, and several residents had lost money selling their apartments. The Oak Room restaurant closed in July 2011, two years after the renovation was completed.

==== Sahara India ownership ====
In mid-2012, Sahara India Pariwar agreed to buy a 75 percent controlling stake for $570 million from El Ad Properties. The deal closed that December. However, even at the time of the sale, Sahara was experiencing legal issues and was selling off other properties that it owned. The development of the nearby Billionaires' Row, an area with several residential skyscrapers marketed for the ultra-wealthy, also negatively affected sales at the Plaza. The Plaza's net income decreased from $3.67 million, in 2012, to negative $1.2 million, in 2014, a figure that declined even further, to negative $10 million, by 2017. Two years after buying the Plaza, Sahara's Subrata Roy announced that he was looking for a buyer for his company's $4 billion majority stake. The Sultan of Brunei made an unsuccessful bid of $680 million. Pras Michel from The Fugees, Miami entrepreneur David Sugarman and others were unsuccessful in their attempt to buy the hotel from Roy for 2.2 billion. In August 2017, after he was unable to secure a buyer, Roy hired a broker to sell the hotel, prompting inquiries from about 50 potential buyers.

Simultaneously, former co-owner Al-Waleed, whose Kingdom Holding Company now owned a minor stake in the hotel, partnered with Ashkenazy Acquisition Corporation. Kingdom and Ashkenazy's partnership included a right of first refusal, which allowed the companies to match any third-party offer for the hotel. In May 2018, the Sahara Group announced it had finalized a deal with businessmen Shahal M. Khan and Kamran Hakim to buy a majority share of the hotel for $600 million. However, Ashkenazy and Kingdom exercised their right of first refusal, and sued Sahara for trying to sell the hotel to a third party. Ashkenazy and Kingdom received an extension to close their purchase of the Plaza, but instead opted to sell their stake to Qatari state-owned hotelier Katara Hospitality, which the companies felt was better positioned to close the sale.

==== Katara Hospitality ownership ====
Seen from the northeast

In July 2018, Katara Hospitality acquired full ownership of the Plaza Hotel after buying Sahara's and Askenazy and Kingdom's stakes. Under Katara's ownership, the condominium units garnered high asking prices: for instance, a four-bedroom unit was listed for $45 million in early 2020. Around the same time, the Plaza's condominium board sought to make repairs to the facade. Because of the COVID-19 pandemic in New York City, and a corresponding downturn in tourism globally, the Plaza's hotel rooms were temporarily closed in March 2020, and several hundred employees were laid off. When the Plaza Hotel reopened in May 2021, public spaces such as the Palm Court were rearranged to allow social distancing.

By the mid-2020s, the values of many condominiums had decreased, amid competition from newer luxury developments nearby and complaints about poor-quality material. In 2026, Katara announced that, starting the following January, it would close the hotel for at least four years for facade repairs. While the interiors were not planned to be renovated, the full closure was necessitated by anticipated high noise levels.

== Residents and guests ==
=== Residents ===
When the current Plaza Hotel opened in 1907, the first guest to sign its register was Alfred Gwynne Vanderbilt. The hotel also housed other wealthy residents, such as George Jay Gould, as well as Oliver Harriman Jr. and his wife Grace Carley Harriman. John Gates, the hotel's co-developer, had a 16-room apartment on floor 3, which he rented for $15,000 a year. (Note: Equivalent to $553000 in 2025) Harry Frank Guggenheim lived in the hotel's State Apartment, while Russian princess Vilma Lwoff-Parlaghy, a prominent portrait painter in the early 20th century, lived in a suite on floor 3 with her lion. The hotel's appeal to the wealthy came from the fact that, in the early 20th century, apartments at the Plaza were generally cheaper than in more upscale apartment buildings, and that it faced Central Park, which at the time was well patronized by the wealthy.

Later in the 20th century, the Plaza Hotel served as home to "wealthy widows", such as performer Kay Thompson, who wrote the Eloise children's book series about a young girl who lived at the hotel. During the Great Depression, the "wealthy widows" were considered "a tourist attraction in their own right", with their rents keeping the hotel solvent. The hotel's other residents included playwright Ferenc Molnár.

After many units were converted to condominium units in 2008, the Plaza Hotel became even more coveted by the wealthy. However, only about a third of these buyers were full-time residents, with the remainder using their Plaza condominiums as pieds-a-terre. The residents included executives such as New England Patriots owner Robert Kraft, JetBlue CEO David Barger, Bear Stearns CEO James Cayne, Viacom CEO Thomas E. Dooley, Sony Music Entertainment CEO Doug Morris, and Idols franchise producer Simon Fuller. Other notable residents included developer Christian Candy and fashion designer Tommy Hilfiger.

=== Guests ===
The guest rooms have also housed notable personalities, such as opera singer Enrico Caruso, as well as novelists F. Scott Fitzgerald and Zelda Fitzgerald. Frank Lloyd Wright often stayed at the Plaza while designing the Solomon R. Guggenheim Museum on Fifth Avenue, maintaining a suite on the second floor between 1954 and 1959. Art dealer Joseph Duveen, 1st Baron Duveen, who helped assemble the Frick Collection at the nearby Frick House, lived at the Plaza and held important auctions in the ballroom. In addition, the Beatles stayed at the Plaza Hotel during their first visit to the United States in February 1964.

== Social scene ==
The Plaza Hotel became associated with celebrities and the wealthy upon its opening, surpassing the original Waldorf Astoria in that respect. The Palm Court (then the tea room), with its mostly female guest list, was particularly frequented. Weeks after the hotel's 1907 opening, actress Mrs Patrick Campbell attempted to smoke there, and the resulting controversy boosted the Plaza's stature. In January 1908, crowds flocked to see heiress Gladys Vanderbilt and her fiancé, Hungarian count László Széchenyi, have tea, while Theodora Shonts arrived with her fiancé Emmanuel d'Albert de Luynes, the Duke of Chaulnes. That year, the New York World dubbed the hotel the "Home-for-the-Incurably Opulent". By 1909, the Palm Court was consistently exceeding its 350-person capacity.

During the 1920s, the basement's grill room was a popular meeting place for young adults born during the Lost Generation. The Oak Room was frequented by actor George M. Cohan, and a commemorative plaque for Cohan was installed in the room in the 1940s after his death. The Persian Room was popular with the "cafe society", being frequented by socialites and fashion trendsetters. Eddy Duchin and Hildegarde were among the Persian Room's early performers, and it later attracted others, such as Eartha Kitt, Peggy Lee, and Liza Minnelli. By the 1970s, the Persian Room hosted performances by pop singers such as Robert Goulet and Dusty Springfield.

The hotel has also been popular among world leaders, particularly presidents of the United States. The first of these was Theodore Roosevelt, the 26th U.S. president, who moved his Republican Party's events to the Plaza Hotel from the Fifth Avenue Hotel after the closure of the latter in 1908. Theodore Roosevelt's distant cousin, president Franklin D. Roosevelt, had his birthday luncheon in the Palm Court in 1935. Other U.S. presidents who frequented the hotel's guestrooms or restaurants have included William Howard Taft, Harry S. Truman, and Richard Nixon, as well as onetime owner Donald Trump. For other world leaders, the Plaza Hotel kept a set of national flags, so that an appropriate one could be displayed whenever a foreign head of state visited. Chiang Ching-kuo, at the time the Vice Premier of the Republic of China, was shot by Taiwanese student Peter Huang in an attempted assassination at the hotel on April 24, 1970.

The Plaza Hotel has hosted diplomatic events, as in September 1985, when the finance ministers of several countries signed the Plaza Accord, by which the U.S. dollar was depreciated in relation to other currencies. The Plaza Hotel hosted the NBA draft from 1962 until 1967, as well as in 1978 and 1979.

=== Receptions ===
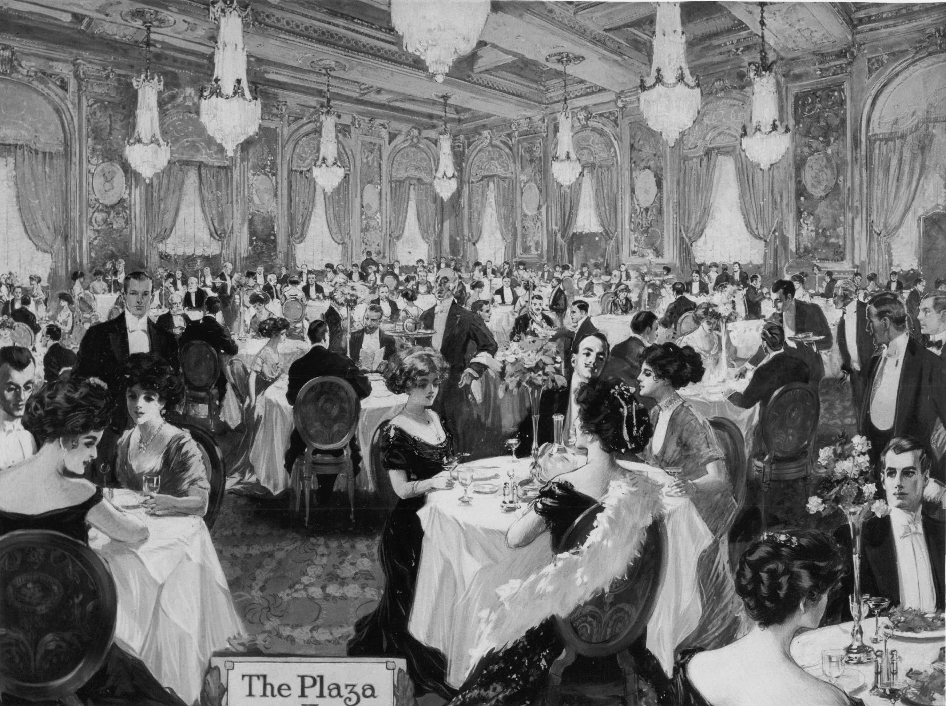
Depiction of a dinner at the Plaza Hotel in 1908

The Terrace Room has frequently been used for press conferences, luncheons, and receptions. For instance, it hosted a 1956 press conference where Laurence Olivier and Marilyn Monroe talked about their upcoming film The Prince and the Showgirl. At a press conference in the Terrace Room in 1968, Richard Burton and Elizabeth Taylor discussed their film Dr. Faustus. During the Beatles' 1964 stay at the hotel, visitors were allowed to take pictures with the Beatles in the Terrace Room.

=== Benefits and weddings ===
Upon the Grand Ballroom's opening in 1921, it immediately became popular as a venue for debutante balls, including those in honor of Joan Whitney Payson and Cathleen Vanderbilt. The rebuilt ballroom hosted social benefits, such as a dinner honoring physicist Marie Curie in 1929, and a meeting of the Girls Service League in 1935 that was attended by U.S. first lady Eleanor Roosevelt. Following World War II, the Grand Ballroom again became a popular venue for debutante balls and benefits, including a disabled veterans' benefit called the December Ball, as well as an event benefiting the Kennedy Child Care Study Center in 1959. Writer Truman Capote hosted the "Black and White Ball" there in 1966, in honor of publisher Katharine Graham. Another popular venue for benefits was the Terrace Court, which hosted events such as the Mid-Winter Ball in 1949.

The Grand Ballroom and Terrace Room have also been used for weddings and wedding receptions. For example, the Terrace Room held the reception for figure skater Sonja Henie's 1949 wedding to Winthrop Gardiner Jr. Peter Lawford and Patricia Kennedy Lawford's wedding reception was hosted in the ballroom in 1954, as was David Eisenhower and Julie Nixon Eisenhower's reception in 1968. The ballroom also hosted Donald Trump and Marla Maples's 1993 wedding. In 2000, actors Michael Douglas and Catherine Zeta-Jones married at the Plaza.

== Impact and legacy ==
The Palm Court in winter

The Plaza Hotel has become an icon of New York City. Paul Goldberger, writing for The New York Times in 1982, stated that the Plaza had become an important part of the city's architectural history, similar to the Grand Central Terminal and the New York Public Library Main Branch. As another historian said, "Every tourist I've ever met, every [tour] group I've ever had, they all know the Plaza Hotel". The National Trust for Historic Preservation added the Plaza Hotel to the Historic Hotels of America program, for its architectural and historical significance, in 1991.

=== Critical reception ===
Upon the present building's opening, the design of the hotel, particularly the interiors, received mostly positive criticism. The New York Times characterized the exterior as "a fitting introduction to the interior", praising the interior for its relative modesty compared to other hotels. However, H. W. Frohne wrote that Hardenbergh had "fail[ed] to make the public rooms entertaining". Critics for two architectural magazines also praised the carved woodwork in the Oak Room and the greenery that originally adorned the Palm Court. For the latter, the Times praised the "gardenlike" effect of the Palm Court, enhanced by its glass ceiling. Frank Lloyd Wright wrote that Hardenbergh's exterior design for the Plaza Hotel was an early skyscraper with "a human sense", in contrast to later skyscrapers, which Wright described as "monstrous thing[s]".

In the 1967 book The Plaza, Its Life and Times, Eve Brown wrote that "The Plaza has managed always to be in tune with the times, its dignity unruffled, its good taste unimpaired". Ada Louise Huxtable wrote for The New York Times in 1971 that the Plaza Hotel was the city's "most celebrated symbol of cosmopolitan and turn-of-the-century splendor", speaking negatively only of the short-lived Green Tulip restaurant. Judith Gura described the interior spaces as "merg[ing] seamlessly into a harmonious ensemble", despite each space having a distinct character. Curtis Gathje, the Plaza Hotel's official historian and a 25-year veteran of the hotel's staff, stated in 2007, "The Plaza is the epitome of civilized New York."

The site, facing Central Park, was seen as particularly prominent. As early as 1892, Moses King called it "a location of unsurpassed beauty". The rebuilt Plaza was described in a 1907 Architectural Record article as having a site that was "the most unobstructed and charming which could have been selected for a large metropolitan hotel", despite being smaller than that of competitors, such as the Waldorf Astoria. According to Goldberger, the Plaza Hotel's location along both Grand Army Plaza and Central Park made it particularly imposing, with two primary facades. The American Institute of Architects' 2007 survey List of America's Favorite Architecture ranked the Plaza Hotel among the top 150 buildings in the United States. The 2010 edition of the AIA Guide to New York City emphasized the park views, characterizing the third- through fifth-floor suites along Central Park South as having "one of the most exciting views of New York".

=== Landmark designations ===
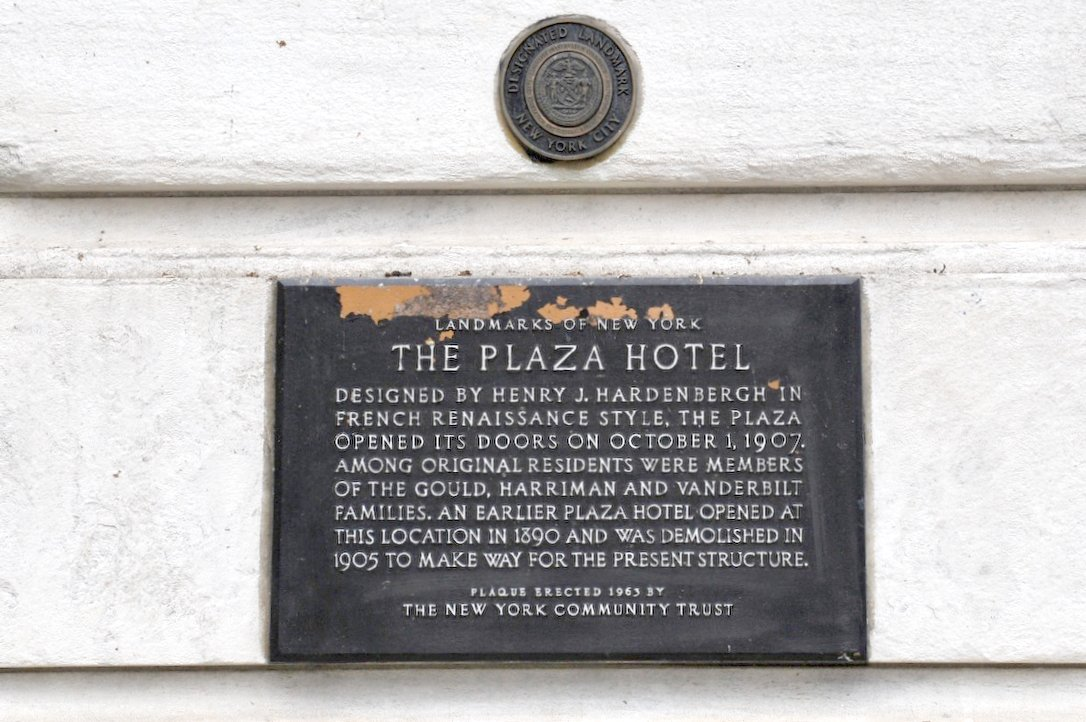
New York City designated landmark plaque

The demolition of the nearby Savoy-Plaza in 1964, and its replacement with the General Motors Building, resulted in a preservation movement to save the Plaza Hotel and nearby structures. This prompted the New York City Planning Commission to rezone a three-block area around Grand Army Plaza, including the Plaza Hotel, in 1968. The Plaza Hotel's exterior was designated a city landmark by the New York City Landmarks Preservation Commission in 1969. The hotel was added to the National Register of Historic Places in 1978, and it was made a National Historic Landmark in 1986.

A large part of the main public space in the interior—including the lobbies, ballroom, and restaurant spaces—was made a New York City designated landmark in 2005. The interior-landmark designation was partially motivated by opposition to El Ad's original plans to renovate the hotel during 2004. The restaurant spaces, preserved under the interior-landmark designation, would have been converted into retail space. The Edwardian Room was not originally part of the landmark designation, but it was ultimately protected along with the other rooms.

=== In media ===
The Plaza Hotel has been used as a setting for several works of literature throughout its history. Most notably, it served as the setting for the Eloise series of books, the success of which led the hotel's owners during the 1960s to hang the character's portrait in the lobby. The Plaza was also featured in F. Scott Fitzgerald's 1925 novel The Great Gatsby.

The hotel is also one of the most popular filming locations in New York City. Films shot or set in the hotel include North by Northwest (1959), Barefoot in the Park (1967), Funny Girl (1968), Plaza Suite (1971), The Way We Were (1973), and Home Alone 2: Lost in New York (1992). Other films that show the Plaza include Arthur (1981), Crocodile Dundee (1986), Scent of a Woman (1992), Sleepless in Seattle (1993), and It Could Happen to You (1994). The Plaza Hotel has also been featured in the television series The Sopranos.

The Plaza has refused or set unusual conditions for some productions wanting to film there. For example, when the Plaza's managers refused to allow the producers of Big Business (1988) to film there, the film's producers created their own version of the Plaza Hotel on a sound stage. When Home Alone 2: Lost in New York was being filmed, director Chris Columbus said that Donald Trump requested a cameo in the film, in exchange for allowing the film crew to shoot scenes in the lobby. The lobby scene involved the star sliding across the floor, so the carpeting was removed, thus revealing some old tilework with the Plaza logo that had been concealed for several decades. The management decided not to replace the carpet.

== See also ==
- List of hotels in New York City
- List of New York City Designated Landmarks in Manhattan from 14th to 59th Streets
- National Register of Historic Places listings in Manhattan from 14th to 59th Streets
