= Kamran Hakim =

American businessperson (born 1941)

- Born: July 1941 (age 85); Tehran, Iran
- Occupation: Real estate developer
- Known for: Founder of the Hakim Organization
- Spouse: Ellen Manocherian
- Children: Scott Hakim; Wendy Hakim Jaffe; Catherine Hakim Brodsky

Kamran Hakim (Persian: کامران حکیم; born 1941) is an American multibillionaire real estate businessman of Iranian Jewish descent. He is one of New York City's largest private landlords.

== Biography ==
Hakim was born to a Jewish family in Iran and then immigrated to the United States. He founded the Hakim Organization in 1978. He is press shy and typically avoids the limelight.

Hakim owns a portfolio of over 200 buildings worth in excess of $7.0 billion with a concentration on New York City's Upper West Side and Upper East Side. Hakim's focus is to purchase rent-stabilized buildings that need infrastructure investment, make the necessary capital improvements, and then transition them to the market rate. He also owns 3,000 market-rate multifamily rental units in Los Angeles.

In 2003, he and his only son, Scott Hakim, erected the 480-unit The Anthem on the East Side of Midtown Manhattan. In November 2012, he purchased the historic El Royale in Hollywood with real-estate attorney Farhad Eshaghpour for $29.5 million in cash. In 2017, Hakim developed 1 QPS with Property Markets Group and New Valley. In 2017, Hakim also purchased one of the largest vacant sites in Gowanus, Brooklyn with Yoel Goldman and Property Markets Group. In 2018, he entered contract alongside Shahal M. Khan to buy Manhattan's Plaza Hotel for $600 million. The acquisition did not end up happening.

== Personal life ==
Hakim practices Judaism and is married to Ellen Manocherian of the Manocherian family, a multibillionaire real estate development family in New York City. They have four children: Scott Hakim, Pamela Hakim Small, Wendy Hakim Jaffe, and Catherine Hakim Brodsky. He and his only son Scott also run Old Salem Farm, the most prestigious horse-show venue in North Salem, a town known as "Billionaires' Dirt Road". Longtime clients and patrons include some of the world's foremost business leaders and entrepreneurs, including many residents of North Salem. Old Salem Farm was famously owned previously by actor Paul Newman and actress Joanne Woodward. Kamran avoids publicity and prefers to operate behind the scenes. He is a supporter of the Jewish Museum in Manhattan and the Center for Jewish History. He is on the board of International Trustees for the Israel Cancer Research Fund.
