= Proactiv =

Acne focused skincare products

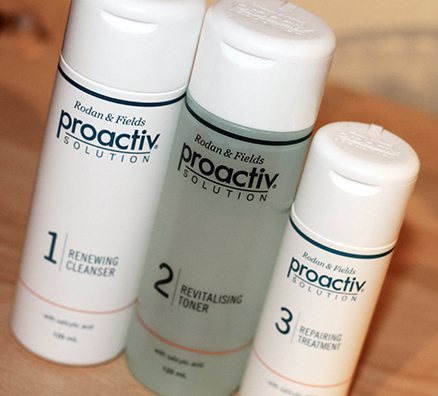
- Product type: Skincare
- Current owner: Guthy-Renker; Galderma
- Country: United States
- Introduced: October 1995; 31 years ago
- Markets: Australasia, Europe, North America, Scandinavia
- Previous owners: Katie Rodan; Kathy Fields
- Ambassadors: Justin Bieber; Sean Combs; Avril Lavigne; Jessica Simpson
- Website: proactiv.com

Proactiv is an American brand of skin-care products developed by two American dermatologists, Katie Rodan and Kathy A. Fields, and launched in 1995 by Guthy-Renker, a California-based direct marketing company, that was endorsed by celebrities. The range includes moisturizers, body washes and treatment products, but the brand is known for its three-step anti-acne Solutions 3-step routine consisting of a BPO cleanser, glycolic toner and treatment lotion. Proactiv+, a reformulation of the three-step kit, was introduced in 2013, and in 2017, ProactivMD launches powered by Adapalene.

As a result of its celebrity endorsements and infomercials, Proactiv is one of the most popular skincare brands of all time, according to the Journal of Clinical and Aesthetic Dermatology. Sales amounted to $800 million a year as of 2010, with a media budget of nearly $200 million and $12–15 million for celebrity fees. The product is mostly sold at Ulta Beauty, Target, and online as single-unit items or as part of a continuity program. A month after ordering, customers are sent a three-month supply, which continues until the subscription is cancelled.

== History ==
=== Product development ===
Proactiv was created in the late 1980s by Katie Rodan and Kathy A. Fields, who met while at Stanford University School of Medicine.

Proactiv was offered to Neutrogena, which declined it, but its CEO, Allan Kurtzman, suggested selling it via infomercials. Guthy-Renker were already in the infomercial business and agreed to market and distribute it. The first infomercial appeared in October 1995, offering a money-back guarantee and fast delivery, and featuring spokesmodel Judith Light, who suffered from acne problems herself. Rodan and Fields later founded their own skincare brand, Rodan + Fields.

=== Guthy-Renker ===
Guthy-Renker LLC is a direct-response marketing company registered in El Segundo, California. Founded in November 1988 by Bill Guthy and Greg Renker, the company is known as "the Rolls-Royce" of the infomercial industry. As of 2012, its portfolio of products was making $1.8 billion a year. The range includes Victoria Principal's Principal Secret skincare (its earliest skincare brand), Wen Hair Care, Cindy Crawford's Meaningful Beauty skincare and Jennifer Lopez's JLo Beauty.

=== Nestlé ===
In March 2000, Nestlé joined Guthy-Renker as a majority owner of Proactiv. In October 2016, Nestle sold its shares to EQT AB.

=== Alchemee and Taro ===
In 2022, The Proactiv Company announced its rebrand and repositioning under the new name Alchemee. In early 2022, Alchemee announced its acquisition by Taro Pharmaceutical Industries.

== Products ==
Proactiv is a registered trademark of Alchemee/Taro Pharmaceutical Industries Ltd. The brand's primary products are three-step kits comprising a cleanser, toner/treatment and lotion/moisturizer, which sells for $36 a month in the United States.

The Revitalizing Toner contains glycolic acid, Aloe Barbadensis leaf juice, and witch hazel, an astringent. The active ingredient in the cleanser and lotion, outside Europe, is a 2.5% concentration of micro-crystal benzoyl peroxide. Benzoyl peroxide has been used since 1934 to kill Cutibacterium acnes, the bacterium that causes acne. Several over-the-counter acne treatments contain it, including Clean & Clear, Clearasil, Doctor's Dermatologic Formula, Neutrogena Advanced Systems, PanOxyl and Stridex.

In 2013, Proactiv+ was introduced, it is a paraben-free three-step kit comprising an exfoliating cleanser (Skin Smoothing Exfoliator), treatment (Pore Targeting Treatment) and hydrating moisturizer (Complexion Perfecting Hydrator). The exfoliator contains 2.5% micro-crystal benzoyl peroxide, the treatment contains 2.5% encapsulated benzoyl peroxide, and a moisturizer with 0.5% salicylic acid. It is more hydrating than the original program and designed for dry-to-sensitive skin types.

== Safety and efficacy ==
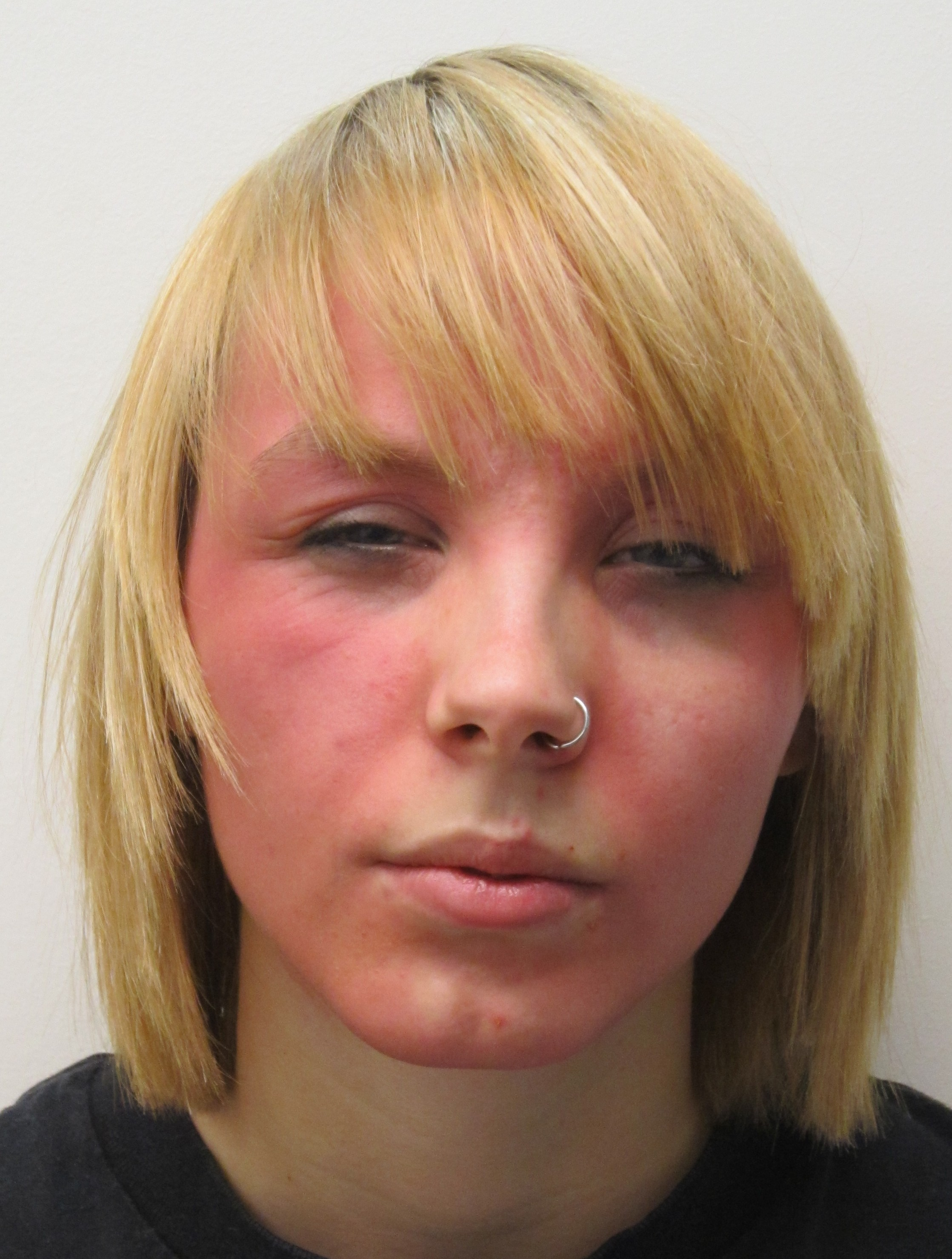
A skin reaction from benzoyl peroxide

Proactiv is aimed at customers with mild to moderate acne. According to a 2011 review, there have been few studies examining its efficacy. A 2007 study saw inflammatory lesions reduced by 39% in subjects using a combination of butenafine and benzoyl peroxide, compared with 34% in those using Proactiv containing only benzoyl peroxide. A physician suggested in Salon that its three-step system might make it easier for teenagers to comply, but that the key to its success lay with its celebrity endorsements.

In 2011, Consumer Reports compared Proactiv (2.5% benzoyl peroxide) with two less expensive products, AcneFree (2.5% benzoyl peroxide) and OXY Maximum (10% benzoyl peroxide). At the time a two-month supply of Proactiv cost around $40 in the US, AcneFree $20 and OXY Maximum $5. Eighty-three subjects, aged 14 to 40, used one of the products twice a day for eight weeks. The magazine reported that, no matter which product was used, after two weeks, around 75% of subjects saw a 35% reduction in blemishes on average. After eight weeks, around 50–66% saw a 40% reduction on average.

Benzoyl peroxide can have a drying effect on the skin, can cause erythema (redness) and fine scaling, though these effects are usually mild, and can increase sensitivity to sunlight. One in 500 may experience allergic contact dermatitis. It is categorized as a pregnancy category C agent, "suggesting that its use in pregnancy may not be prudent," according to a literature review in the Journal of Clinical and Aesthetic Dermatology. (Note: Ashley Decker, Emmy M. Graber (Journal of Clinical and Aesthetic Dermatology, 2012): "Since the 1930s, BP [benzoyl peroxide] has been a popular choice for the treatment of AV [acne vulgaris] due to its keratolytic, moderate comedolytic, and antibacterial properties, which include the reduction of Cutibacterium acnes and Staphylococcus aureus on skin. Cutaneous side effects of BP are most often irritant in nature, may be concentration and/or vehicle-dependent, and are usually mild, including signs such as dryness, erythema, and fine scaling. A minority of the population treated with BP for AV will experience true allergic contact dermatitis (1:500). Although available OTC, BP is a pregnancy category C agent, suggesting that its use in pregnancy may not be prudent.") If benzoyl peroxide comes into contact with clothing it is likely to bleach it.

The US Food and Drug Administration (FDA) warned in 2014 that over-the-counter acne products containing benzoyl peroxide and/or salicylic acid, including Proactiv, can cause severe irritation, as well as rare but life-threatening allergic reactions. Consumers were advised to stop using the products if they experience hives or itching, and to seek emergency medical attention if they feel faint, or experience throat tightness, breathing problems, or swelling of the eyes, face, lips or tongue. The FDA noted that it remains unclear whether the reactions are caused by the active ingredients, inactive ingredients or a combination.

== Sales and marketing ==
=== Sales ===
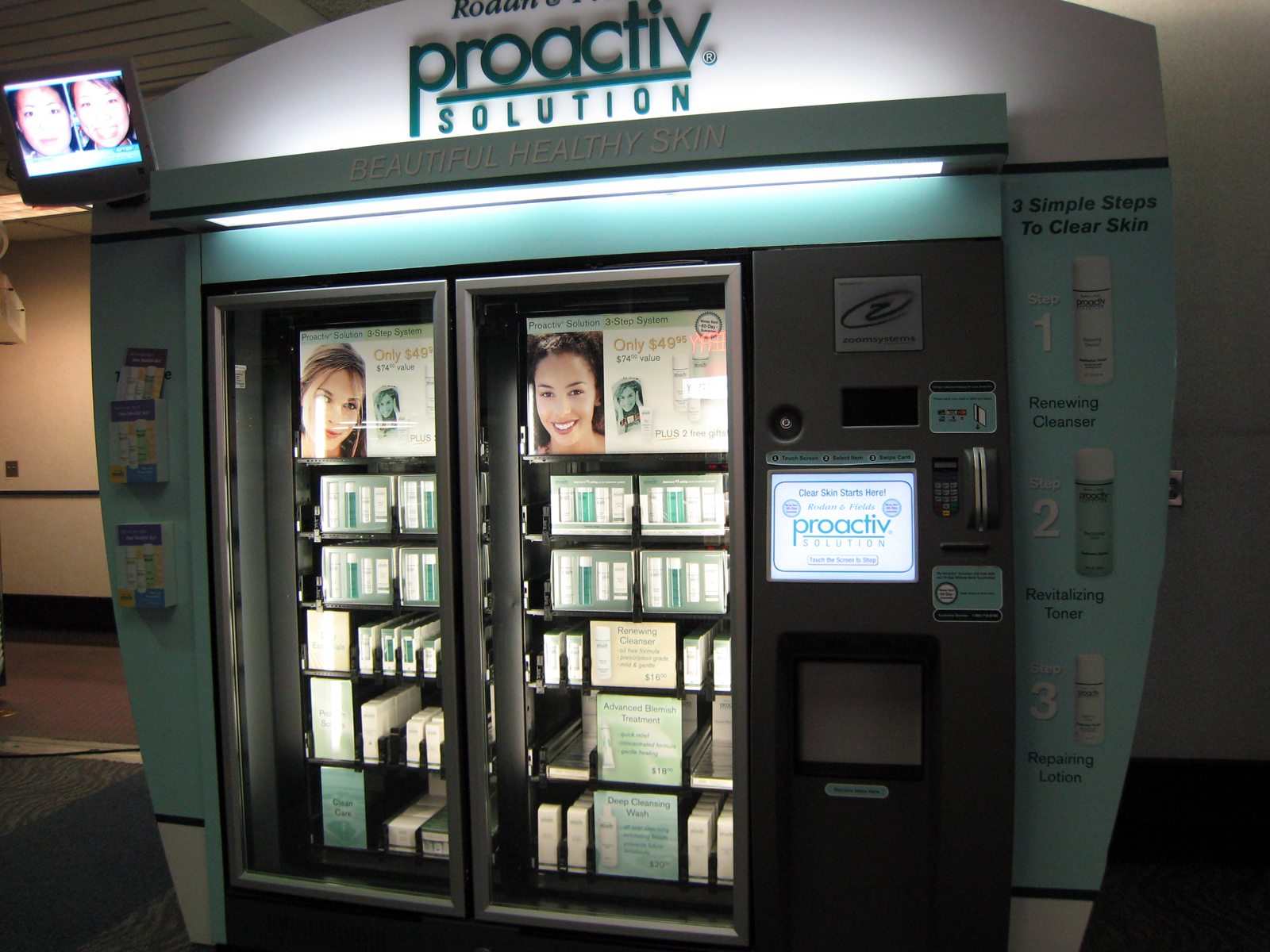
Proactiv vending machine, Indianapolis International Airport, 2008

Proactiv is marketed and distributed by Guthy-Renker and is responsible for about half the company's revenue. Sales of Proactiv amounted to $800 million as of 2010. 70% of sales were in the United States as of 2007.

The product is available in some stores, including Boots in the UK, and in kiosks and vending machines (known as ZoomShops) in malls and airports through a partnership between American Kiosk Management and Guthy-Renker . But the product is mostly sold online or through a toll-free number directly by Guthy-Renker; 60% of Proactiv orders were placed online as of 2010. In 2016, Proactiv began selling their products at Ulta Beauty.

=== Continuity program ===
Alchemee sells Proactiv as part of a continuity program, also known as a negative-option offer, whereby customers are sent repeat orders of the program until they cancel their subscription. When purchasing directly from the company, customers automatically become members of a Proactiv club. A month after ordering, and every three months thereafter, they are sent a three-month supply costing $34.95 (in the US as of 2022). They are billed monthly until they cancel the subscription. The approach is based on the customer lifetime value model.

=== Commercials and advertising ===
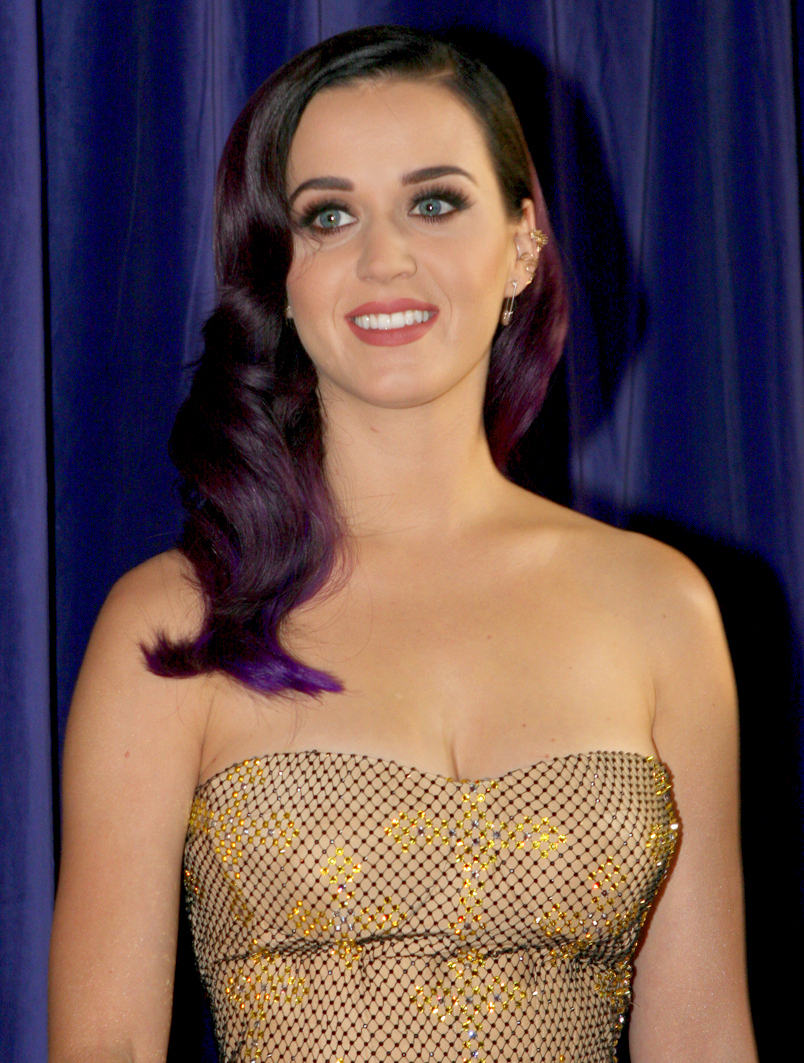
American singer Katy Perry has been featured in an infomercial for Proactiv.

At the time Guthy-Renker owned Proactiv, they had a media budget of $200 million for the brand, much of it spent on air-time, and was spending another $12–15 million a year on celebrity endorsements. Justin Bieber for example, was paid $3 million over two years. Its infomercials have featured celebrities who have themselves suffered from acne problems; the list includes Jennifer Love Hewitt, Kelly Clarkson, P. Diddy, Avril Lavigne, Lindsay Lohan, Alyssa Milano, Katy Perry, Jessica Simpson, Britney Spears, Kendall Jenner and Vanessa Williams.

According to the New York Times, until 2010 Proactiv infomercials were "fast-talking" and "hard-selling"; an announcer repeatedly advised viewers to "call now," and offered faster shipping if the order was placed within three minutes. As infomercials became less popular, Proactiv sales stalled. Since 2010 Guthy-Renker has tried to move the brand into the mainstream cosmetics market, focusing on quality rather than price. It began advertising on network television during shows like American Idol, and in Elle, InStyle and People magazines.

In 2012, the Advertising Standards Authority (ASA) in the UK banned some of Proactiv's advertising as misleading. A viewer complained that the celebrities were likely to have used the US version of Proactiv, which differs from the UK version. According to the ASA, the celebrities had signed statements saying they had used the UK version for a few weeks one to three years earlier, but the advertisements gave the appearance that they had continued to benefit from it, so the viewer's complaint was upheld.
