= Renker =

Renker is a surname. Notable people with the surname include:

- Gustav Renker (1889–1967), Austrian and Swiss journalist and writer
- Greg Renker (born 1957), American businessman

== See also ==
- Guthy-Renker, a California-based direct-response marketing company
