= Judge Pregerson =

Judge Pregerson may refer to:

- Dean Pregerson (born 1951), judge of the United States District Court for the Central District of California
- Harry Pregerson (1923–2017), judge appointed to the United States Court of Appeals for the Ninth Circuit
