= Rodan + Fields =

American skincare and haircare company

Rodan + Fields, LLC
- Type: Private
- Industry: Cosmetics and personal care products
- Founded: 2007; 19 years ago
- Founder: Katie Rodan; Kathy Fields
- Headquarters: San Ramon, California, U.S.
- Area served: United States, Canada, Australia
- Key people: Dimitri Haloulos (President and CEO)
- Products: Cosmetics and personal care products
- Website: www.rodanandfields.com

Rodan & Fields, LLC, known as Rodan + Fields or R+F, is an American skincare and haircare company. Katie Rodan and Kathy A. Fields, creators of Proactiv, founded Rodan + Fields in 2000 and sold it in 2003. They relaunched the brand in 2007 as a multi-level marketing firm, using independent consultants to sell its products. This business model has been criticized by consumer advocates as being a pyramid scheme.

In 2024, Rodan +Fields announced that it changed to an affiliate-based direct-to-consumer business model.

== History ==
Fields and Rodan met in 1984 during their dermatology residency at Stanford University School of Medicine. In 1995, they developed Proactiv Solution as a preventative skincare for acne. Proactiv is now a registered trademark of Guthy-Renker and Nestlé.

Fields and Rodan founded Rodan + Fields in 2000 and later launched a line of products sold in department stores. In 2003, the company was purchased by Estée Lauder. In 2007, Fields and Rodan reacquired the brand and transitioned the company from department stores to multi-level marketing, where consultants could earn a commission for their own sales and for the sales of people they recruited. Rodan + Fields launched in Canada in February 2015 and in Australia in September 2017.

In 2018, private equity firm TPG bought a minority stake in the company. At the time, Rodan + Fields was valued at $4 billion.

In April 2020, the US Federal Trade Commission (FTC) issued a warning letter to Rodan + Fields for making unlawful and misleading earnings claims related to COVID-19.

In October 2022, the founders launched a whole line of shampoos, conditioners and stylers, on top of their skincare. In November 2022, Rodan and Fields were a part of a class action lawsuit in regards to their Lash Boost serum. The company offered $38 million to resolve the issue as well as change their verbiage on the product usage, instructions, and warnings.

== Products ==
In 2002, Fields and Rodan launched their skincare line. Those products ranged from cleansers, to acne treatments. Their Redefine skincare line is a three step regimen. Starting from either a Clay or Foaming Cleanser (Step 1), a Pore Refining Toner (Step 2), A Defense Lotion or Cream (Step 3), and lastly a Restorative Cream or Lotion (Step 4).

In 2020, the company launched its Anti-Aging Regimen.

In 2022, the company expanded into haircare and launched the Volume+ and Smooth+ lines, both with a scalp-first approach.

== Business ==
Rodan + Fields has its headquarters in San Francisco, California. Its products include cleansers, toners, moisturizers, creams, exfoliators and sunscreens.

Starting in 2007, Rodan + Fields distributes via multi-level marketing, which has been criticized by consumer advocates as akin to a pyramid scheme. Consultants focused on social media, phone and in-person presentations to sell products and invite others to join their team. The average 2015 annual income for a consultant was $3,182.

Per the 2016 Income-Disclosure agreement, 90% of Rodan + Fields members earned less than $200 per month and 96% earned less than $500 per month. In 2016, 125,348 (representing 44% of all recruits) recorded zero earnings and are thus no longer considered active. 2% of active sellers make the annual minimum wage or higher. Most use Rodan + Fields to supplement, not replace, other work.

Rodan + Fields announced in July 2024 that it would switch from a multi-level direct selling strategy to an affiliate program on September 1, 2024. R+F cut 100 positions and reorganized its business structure to a direct-to-consumer model. Only current R+F consultants are eligible to join its affiliate program.
