= Katie Rodan =

American dermatologist, entrepreneur, and author (born 1955 or 1956)

- Born: Katie Pregerson; 1955 or 1956 (age 70–71)
- Education: University of Virginia; University of Southern California
- Occupations: Dermatologist, entrepreneur, author
- Known for: Co-founder of Proactiv and Rodan + Fields
- Spouse: Amnon Rodan
- Children: 2
- Father: Harry Pregerson
- Relatives: Dean Pregerson (brother)
- Website: drrodan.com

Katie Rodan (née Pregerson, born 1955–1956) is an American dermatologist, entrepreneur, and author. She is co-creator of the acne management system Proactiv, co-founder of multi-level marketing skincare company Rodan + Fields, and operates a private cosmetic dermatology practice in Oakland, California. In 2015, she was listed by Forbes as one of the 50 most successful self-made women in the United States.

== Early life ==
Katie was born Katie Pregerson, the daughter of Bernardine and Harry Pregerson, a microbiology professor and a federal appeals court judge, respectively. Rodan's family is Jewish and she was raised in Los Angeles. She earned her undergraduate degree in history from the University of Virginia and her Doctor of Medicine degree from the University of Southern California School of Medicine. She completed her internship at Los Angeles County Hospital and in 1987 completed her residency in dermatology at Stanford University School of Medicine, where she was also appointed chief resident.

== Career ==
In 1984, Rodan and Kathy A. Fields met during their dermatology residency at Stanford University School of Medicine. In 1995, they developed Proactiv Solution as a skincare treatment for acne. After initially receiving 15% royalties, each was bought out for $50million dollars.

Rodan is an adjunct clinical assistant professor of dermatology at Stanford University and has a private practice in medical, surgical, and cosmetic dermatology.

In 2008, she was named a top doctor in the East Bay by Oakland Magazine. Rodan has been featured in print and broadcast media as an expert in dermatology, particularly cosmetic dermatology. She has been interviewed and quoted in media, including Fox Business News, Shape Magazine O Magazine, Women's Health Redbook, Allure, and Cosmopolitan.

In 2002, they launched Rodan + Fields. In 2003, Rodan + Fields was purchased by Estée Lauder. In 2007, Rodan and Fields bought back the brand from Estée Lauder because they felt "over time it became clear to the doctors that Estee Lauder's priority was its larger legacy brands" and not Rodan+Fields.

In 2006, the company moved to direct sales and multi-level marketing. Rodan + Fields uses independent consultants, mostly women, to sell its products. Only two percent of these consultants make more than minimum wage. Its business model has been criticized by consumer advocates as being close to a pyramid scheme According to data from its 2015 income disclosure, 42% didn't get a single paycheck last year.

== Works ==
Rodan has co-authored books with Fields:

- M.D. Rodan, Katie; M.D. Fields, Kathy (2009). Write Your Skin a Prescription for Change. Pair O' Docs MD Publishing. ISBN 978-0982460801. OL 24091153M.
- M.D. Rodan, Katie; M.D. Fields, Kathy (2008). Unblemished: Stop Breakouts! Fight Acne! Transform Your Life! Reclaim Your Self-Esteem with the Proven 3-Step Program Using Over-the-Counter Medications. Simon & Schuster. ISBN 978-1416595793.
- M.D. Rodan, Katie; M.D. Fields, Kathy (2006). The Doctors' Secrets to a Lifetime of Clear Skin. Guthy Renker. ISBN 0615335241.
- M.D. Rodan, Katie; M.D. Fields, Kathy (2006). Lighten Up, Brighten Up. Atria Books. ISBN 0743498631.

== Personal life ==
Rodan is married to Amnon Rodan. Ammon has an MBA from Harvard and was on the board of Guthy Renker. The couple has two children and live in San Francisco, California.
