= Andris Nelsons =

Latvian conductor (born 1978)

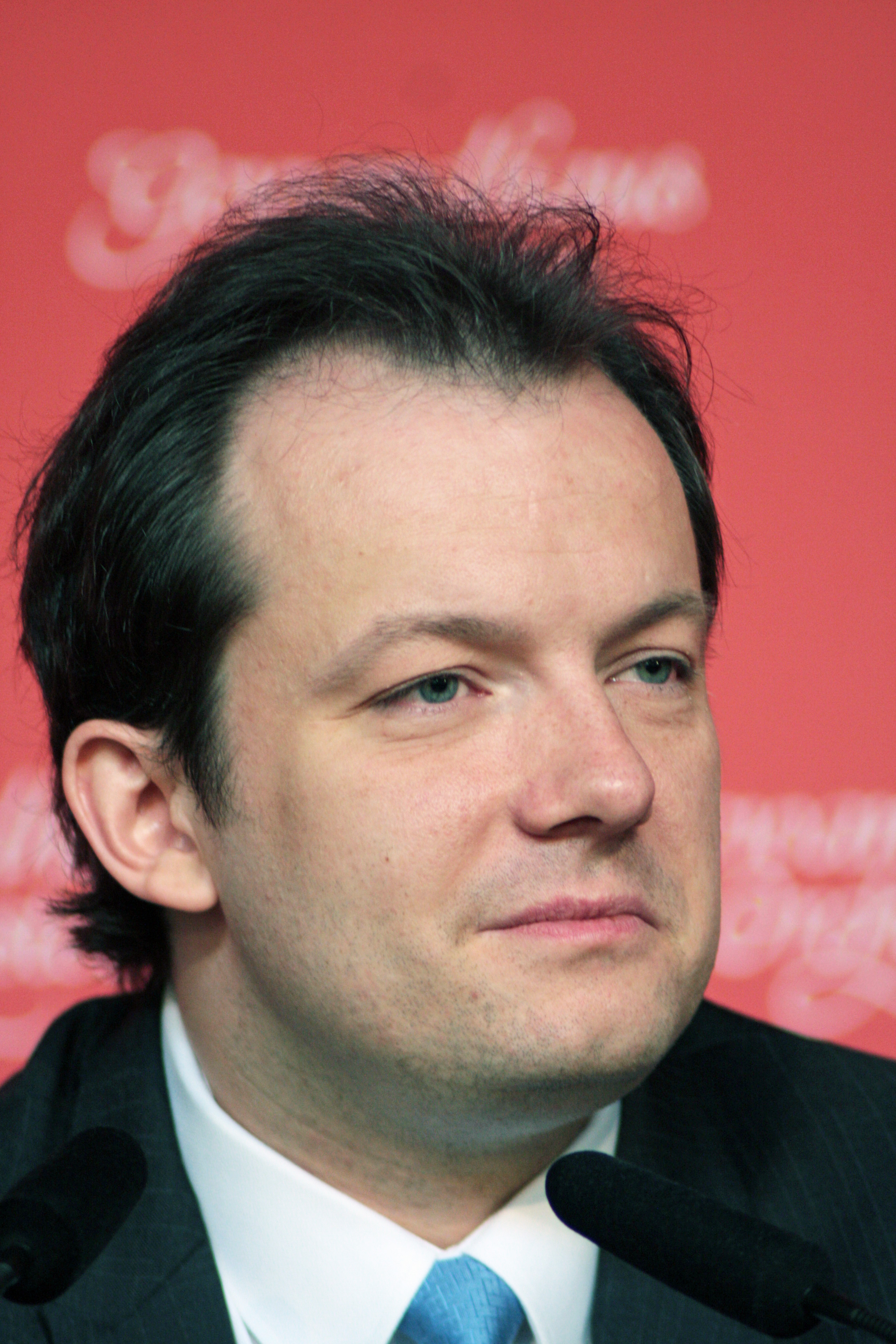
- Nelsons on 9 September 2015
- Born: 18 November 1978 (age 47); Riga, Latvian SSR
- Occupation: Conductor
- Years active: 2003–present
- Organizations: BSO; Leipzig Gewandhaus Orchestra; CBSO; Nordwestdeutsche Philharmonie; LNOB
- Spouse: Kristine Opolais (m. 2011; div. 2018)
- Children: 1
- Website: andrisnelsons.com

Andris Nelsons OBE (born 18 November 1978) is a Latvian conductor. He is currently music director of the Boston Symphony Orchestra and Gewandhauskapellmeister of the Leipzig Gewandhaus Orchestra. He was previously music director of the Latvian National Opera, chief conductor of the Nordwestdeutsche Philharmonie, and music director of the City of Birmingham Symphony Orchestra.

== Early life ==
Nelsons was born in Riga. His mother founded the first early music ensemble in Latvia, and his father was a choral conductor, cellist, and teacher. When he was five years old, his mother and stepfather (a choir conductor) took him to a performance of Wagner's Tannhäuser, which Nelsons refers to as a profoundly formative experience: "...it had a hypnotic effect on me. I was overwhelmed by the music. I cried when Tannhäuser died. I still think this was the biggest thing that happened in my childhood."

As a youth, Nelsons studied piano, and took up the trumpet at the age of 12. He also sang bass-baritone, with a special interest in early music, in his mother's ensemble. He studied for one summer at the Dartington International Summer School with Evelyn Tubb. He served as a trumpeter with the orchestra of the Latvian National Opera.

== Conducting career ==
Nelsons studied conducting with Alexander Titov in Saint Petersburg, Russia, and participated in conducting master classes with Neeme Järvi, Roberto Carnevale and Jorma Panula. He came to the attention of Mariss Jansons when he emergency-substituted with the Oslo Philharmonic in their trumpet section during an orchestra tour. Nelsons counted Jansons as a mentor and began conducting studies with him in 2002.

In 2003, Nelsons became principal conductor of the Latvian National Opera. He concluded his tenure there after four years in 2007. In 2006, Nelsons became chief conductor of the Nordwestdeutsche Philharmonie of Herford, Germany, a post he held until the end of the 2008/09 season. His first conducting appearance at the Metropolitan Opera was in October 2009, a production of Puccini's Turandot. In July 2010, Nelsons made his debut at the Bayreuth Festival, conducting a new production of Wagner's Lohengrin at the opening performance of the festival.

=== City of Birmingham Symphony Orchestra ===
In the UK, Nelsons's early work included studio concerts with the BBC Philharmonic in Manchester, and his first BBC Philharmonic concert at the Bridgewater Hall was in November 2007. In October 2007, the City of Birmingham Symphony Orchestra (CBSO) named Nelsons as its 12th principal conductor and music director, effective with the 2008/09 season, with an initial contract for three years. The appointment was unusual in that Nelsons had conducted the CBSO only in a private concert and in a recording session, without a public concert engagement, prior to being named to the post. His first public conducting appearance with the CBSO was on 11 November 2007 in a matinee concert, and his first subscription concert appearance with the CBSO was in March 2008. In July 2009, Nelsons extended his CBSO contract for an additional three years, through the 2013/14 season. In August 2012, the CBSO announced the extension of his CBSO contract formally through the 2014/15 season, and then for subsequent seasons on the basis of an annual rolling renewal. In October 2013, the CBSO announced the conclusion of Nelsons's tenure as music director after the end of the 2014/15 season.

=== Boston Symphony Orchestra ===
Nelsons made his first guest-conducting appearance with the Boston Symphony Orchestra (BSO) in March 2011 as an emergency substitute for James Levine, at Carnegie Hall. He then guest-conducted the BSO at the Tanglewood Music Festival in July 2012 before making his first appearance with the BSO at Symphony Hall, Boston in January 2013. That May the orchestra appointed him as its 15th music director, starting in the fall of 2014, with an initial contract for 5 years and the stipulation that he would make 8 to 10 weeks of appearances in the first season and 12 weeks per season thereafter.

Scene from the documentary Nelsons No. 5 with the Royal Concertgebouw Orchestra

Nelsons held the title of Music Director Designate in the 2013/14 season. In August 2015, the BSO announced the extension of Nelsons's contract as music director through the 2021/22 season with a new contract, for eight years, that replaced the initial five-year contract, and also contained an evergreen clause for automatic renewal. In October 2020, the BSO announced a further extension of Nelsons' contract as music director through August 2025, with an evergreen clause for automatic renewal. In January 2024, the BSO announced the conversion of Nelsons' contract as its music director to a rolling evergreen contract.

On March 6, 2026, the BSO board of directors and BSO president Chad Smith announced that Nelsons is to conclude his Boston Symphony Orchestra tenure at the end of the summer 2027 Tanglewood season. The BSO board of directors stated that:

"The decision to not renew his contract was made by the B.S.O.'s board of trustees because, beyond our shared desire to ensure our orchestra continues to perform at the highest levels, the B.S.O. and Andris Nelsons were not aligned on future vision".

Nelsons sent a letter to the orchestra's staff and musicians, saying that "this is not the decision I anticipated or wanted."

The termination of Nelsons' contract was unusually acrimonious and public. The announcement of his firing resulted in an outpouring of support for Nelsons from many patrons and players, including the BSO players' union. BSO musicians interviewed by the New York Times said that Nelsons had been dismissed in part due to his resistance towards the programming of pop music. BSO president and CEO Chad Smith said that Nelsons was not aligned with the organization's goal of "[serving] our communities more expansively and inclusively”, and that the BSO had to “think differently about what it is that we put on our stages, whose voices get to be heard, whose stories get to be told.”

=== Leipzig Gewandhaus Orchestra ===
Nelsons first guest-conducted the Leipzig Gewandhaus Orchestra in 2011. In September 2015, the orchestra announced the appointment of Nelsons as its next Gewandhauskapellmeister, effective with the 2017–2018 season, with an initial contract of 5 seasons. In October 2020, the orchestra announced a further extension of his contract as Gewandhauskapellmeister through 31 July 2027. In August 2025, the Gewandhausorchester announced the most recent extension of Nelsons' contract as Gewandhauskapellmeister for an additional five years, through 31 July 2032.

=== Recording history ===
With the CBSO, Nelsons has recorded music of Pyotr Ilyich Tchaikovsky, Richard Strauss, and Igor Stravinsky for the Orfeo label. Separately from the CBSO, Nelsons has also recorded for the BR-Klassik label and for the label of the Concertgebouw Orchestra. Nelsons has also recorded commercially with the Boston Symphony Orchestra for Deutsche Grammophon, where their recording of the Tenth symphony of Dmitri Shostakovich received a Grammy Award in 2015 for best orchestral performance, and their recordings of Shostakovich's Fifth, Eighth, and Ninth symphonies received a Grammy Award for best orchestral performance in 2016. In 2018, they received another Grammy Award for best orchestral performance, for Shostakovich's Fourth and Eleventh symphonies. In 2019, Deutsche Grammophon released a cycle of the complete Beethoven symphonies recorded by Nelsons with the Vienna Philharmonic.

In December 2019 and January 2020, Nelsons conducted for the first time the Vienna New Year's Concert with the Vienna Philharmonic Orchestra, where he performed the trumpet solo in the Postillon-Galopp of Hans Christian Lumbye, the first conductor to perform a solo in the Vienna New Year's Concert who is not a violinist.

== Personal life ==
Nelsons has been married twice. His first marriage was to the Latvian soprano Kristīne Opolais. They met during Nelsons's tenure at Latvian National Opera, when she was a member of the Latvian National Opera chorus, and later became a solo singer with the company. The couple married in 2011. Their daughter, Adriana Anna, was born on 28 December 2011. The couple announced their divorce on 27 March 2018. Nelsons remarried in April 2019, to Alice Heidler.

Nelsons is a longtime practitioner of Taekwondo, and earned his black belt in November 2022.

Cultural offices
Preceded by Gintaras Rinkevičius	Music Director, Latvian National Opera; 2003–2007	Succeeded by Modestas Pitrėnas
Preceded by Toshiyuki Kamioka	Chief Conductor, Nordwestdeutsche Philharmonie; 2006–2009	Succeeded by Eugene Tzigane
