= Synapse Group =

American multichannel marketing company

Synapse Group, Inc.
- Type: Subsidiary
- Industry: Marketing, Multichannel Marketing, Magazine, Periodical, Subscription, Reward Programs
- Founded: 1991; 35 years ago
- Headquarters: Stamford, Connecticut
- Key people: Scott Macon (president)
- Number of employees: 250+
- Parent: Dotdash Meredith
- Website: www.synapsegroupinc.com

Synapse Group, Inc. is a multichannel marketing company. Synapse is also the largest consumer magazine distributor in the United States, with access to over 700 magazine titles from major publishers, including Hearst Corporation, Condé Nast Publications, Meredith Corporation, and Time Inc. Synapse attracts subscribers for these publications by working through a number of non-traditional marketing channels, including credit card issuers, catalog companies, and airline frequent-flyer programs.

== History ==
Synapse Group began in 1991 as NewSub Magazine Service LLC. Founded by Jay S. Walker (developer of Priceline.com) and Michael Loeb, the company began by marketing fixed-term magazine subscriptions through credit card companies. Over the years, NewSub expanded its marketing channels to include retailers, airlines, catalogers, and dot-com companies. In 2000, the company changed its name to Synapse Group, Inc.

=== Continuous Service System ===
In 1996, NewSub introduced its Continuous Subscription Service system, which would automatically renew subscriptions. The company applied for a patent, which was granted in 2000 to Michael Loeb and Synapse Group, Inc. for "a system for providing an open-ended subscription to commodity items normally available on a term basis includes a central agent that serves as the front-end for commodity suppliers. This central agent maintains databases containing information associated with a group of commodity items and their sales. Using these databases, the central agent produces subscription records to provide open-ended subscription services to its customers, while supporting the term-based subscriptions of the commodity suppliers."

=== Acquisition by Time Inc. ===
In 2000, Time Inc. made its first equity investment in Synapse Group, starting a partnership that would ultimately culminate with the outright purchase of Synapse in 2006. In a 2000 press release from Time Warner, Jeremy Koch (who was Consumer Marketing President at the time) explained, "the marketing of consumer magazines is undergoing substantial change. Our relationship with Synapse is an important part of Time Inc.'s strategy to support the expansion of new and innovative marketing methods."

=== Acquisition of Bizrate Insights ===
In 2016, Time Inc acquired Bizrate Insights, marking Time Inc.'s transformation towards a data-driven organization. The acquisition of Bizrate generated a consumer subscription revenue with a range of owned and operated brands along with third-party products. Consumer data cultivated through Bizrate's survey platform broadened the suite of integrated marketing services (IMS) for Time Inc. to provide to its advertising partners. Bizrate Insights and Time Inc.'s relationship were further formalized.

=== Acquisition of Magazine Discount Center ===
In 2016, Synapse Group stated celebrating its "Acquisition Anniversary" one year after obtaining Bizrate Insights and aforementioned Magazine Discount Center. Bizrate Insights were well known for its consumer ratings of products which earlier partnered with Synapse Group by offering free magazine subscriptions, letting users of "e-commerce sites" provide survey feedback of companies at the end of a purchasing process. Synapse Group previously worked with Magazine Discount Center with managing the website's subscription sales

=== Acquisition of Stop, Breathe & Think and Re-branding to MyLife ===
In 2019, Synapse Group acquired Stop, Breathe & Think, a mindfulness mobile app. In May 2020, the app was re-branded as MyLife. The "mindfulness mobile app" has over a total of 17 million emotional check-ins to date. The app differentiated from its competition was its usage of emotional check-ins, multiple acts, and multi-day programs. With multiple apps for children, as well as distribution on multi-platforms.

== Operations ==
Synapse Group is headquartered at 225 High Ridge Road in Stamford, Connecticut. The company employs over 250 people and has revenues of $400 million.

=== Divisions ===
- Elite Traveler Awards was founded in 1995 as CAP (Customer Appreciation Program) Systems to develop affinity marketing strategies for frequent flyer and other customer reward programs. Members may elect to redeem their frequent flyer miles or other points for subscriptions to traditional print or electronic magazines. Since the program was implemented, an estimated 100 billion frequent flyer miles have been redeemed for magazine subscriptions. But by early 2022, the number of magazines they offered was trimmed dramatically, to less than a dozen choices.
- Magazine Direct, a program introduced in 1998, offers magazine subscriptions to DRTV and catalog customers when they call to place orders.
- SynapseConnect, Inc. is the e-commerce subsidiary of Synapse Group. The company has developed a number of internet-marketing strategies that attempt to use Synapse's offline marketing strength to leverage online sales. Some of its properties include FreeBizMag.com, which launched in 2000 and was the first third-party subscription service for trade publications.
- MyLife, formerly known as Stop, Breathe & Think, is a mindfulness app that provides meditation exercises tailored to how a person responds to questions concerning their current emotional state. The app was created by two women, Jamie Price and Julie Campistron, who both had positive experiences with mindfulness in managing occupational burnout. Much of the app content is free.

=== Service marks ===
Synapse Group has used a number of service marks over time in association with particular business channels, both for direct sales projects as well as with partner services. These marks include: Synapse Group Inc., Newsub Services, Synapse Solutions, Synapse Retail Ventures, and Magazine Rewards Center. These names often appear on customers' credit card statements for the company's subscription service charges. '

=== Deceptive business practices ===
Synapse Group has been prosecuted in court various times for its deceptive auto-renewal schemes, including a 2020 case in Washington State in which it was ordered to pay restitution to 2,000 customers and to the Washington State Office of the Attorney General. According to the news release,

"From 2011 to 2016, Synapse falsely implied on its 'Mags for Miles' mailers that Delta Air Line miles would expire if consumers didn't use them by a specific date. In fact, Delta miles never expire... The company used this misleading claim to motivate consumers to redeem their 'expiring' miles for magazines. After consumers redeemed their miles, Synapse then offered them the separate $2 subscriptions promotion to be paid for with a credit card — which would auto-renew, often without the consumer's knowledge, at an average of about $50 per consumer."
