= Harry Pregerson =

American judge (1923–2017)

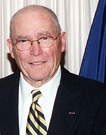

Senior Judge of the United States Court of Appeals for the Ninth Circuit
- In office December 11, 2015 – November 25, 2017

Judge of the United States Court of Appeals for the Ninth Circuit
- In office November 2, 1979 – December 11, 2015
- Appointed by: Jimmy Carter
- Preceded by: Seat established by 92 Stat. 1629
- Succeeded by: Daniel P. Collins

Judge of the United States District Court for the Central District of California
- In office December 7, 1967 – November 6, 1979
- Appointed by: Lyndon B. Johnson
- Preceded by: Seat established by 80 Stat. 75
- Succeeded by: Cynthia Holcomb Hall

Personal details
- Born: October 13, 1923 Los Angeles, California, U.S.
- Died: November 25, 2017 (aged 94) Los Angeles, California, U.S.
- Spouse: Bernardine Pregerson
- Children: Dean and Katie
- Education: University of California, Los Angeles (BA); University of California, Berkeley (LLB)

Harry Pregerson (October 13, 1923 – November 25, 2017) was a United States circuit judge appointed to the United States Court of Appeals for the Ninth Circuit by President Jimmy Carter in 1979.

== Early life and education ==
Pregerson was born and raised in Los Angeles, where his father was a postal worker. Both his parents were Jewish immigrants from Ukraine.

Pregerson was a United States Marine Corps First Lieutenant in World War II, during which he was severely wounded in the Battle of Okinawa (4 May 1945). After the war, Pregerson attended college on the G.I. Bill. He graduated from University of California, Los Angeles with a Bachelor of Arts degree in 1947, and the UC Berkeley School of Law with a Bachelor of Laws in 1950.

== Career ==
Pregerson was in private practice of law in Los Angeles from 1951 to 1953. He was in private practice of law in Van Nuys, California from 1953 to 1965. Pregerson joined the Los Angeles Municipal Court in 1965 and advanced to the Los Angeles County Superior Court the next year, serving until 1967.

=== Federal judicial service ===
Pregerson was nominated by President Lyndon B. Johnson on November 29, 1967, to the United States District Court for the Central District of California, to a new seat created by 80 Stat. 75. He was confirmed by the United States Senate on December 7, 1967, and received his commission the same day. His service was terminated on November 6, 1979, due to elevation to the Ninth Circuit.

Pregerson was nominated by President Jimmy Carter on August 28, 1979, to the United States Court of Appeals for the Ninth Circuit, to a new seat created by 92 Stat. 1629. He was confirmed by the Senate on October 31, 1979, and received his commission on November 2, 1979. He assumed senior status on December 11, 2015. His service terminated on November 25, 2017, due to his death in Los Angeles.

== Judicial philosophy ==
At his confirmation hearing, Pregerson told the United States Senate Committee on the Judiciary that "My conscience is a product of the Ten Commandments, the Bill of Rights, the Boy Scout Oath, and the Marine Corps Hymn. If I had to follow my conscience or the law, I would follow my conscience." The conservative commentator Hugh Hewitt criticized him for "judicial activism" and "rul[ing] with his heart instead of his head."

=== Criminal punishment ===
In 1992, Pregerson halted the execution of Robert Alton Harris after the prisoner had been strapped into the gas chamber. The U.S. Supreme Court allowed the execution to proceed two hours later. In 2003, Pregerson refused to follow Supreme Court precedent regarding California's three-strikes law and continued dissenting whenever the court imposed that law.

=== Involvement in California recall election ===
Pregerson was part of a unanimous three-judge panel that ordered the postponement of the 2003 California recall election based on the Equal Protection Clause of the Fourteenth Amendment because in the recall, six counties would use the antiquated punched cards voting system. The decision, however, was subsequently overturned by the en banc court of Ninth Circuit. Eventually, the recall was successful in removing Gray Davis from governorship, and Arnold Schwarzenegger became the new governor of California.

=== Federalism ===
Pregerson was a supporter of federalism and favors restraints on the power of federal government. He wrote the majority decision in the Ninth Circuit panel on Gonzales v. Raich, holding that the Interstate Commerce Clause forbade the federal government from interfering with state laws that permitted the use of medical marijuana. The ruling was later overturned by the Supreme Court, however, which held that it is within Congressional power to regulate intrastate activities that are seen to influence interstate commerce, including using homegrown marijuana for medical purposes.

Pregerson's first ruling on Raich was based on federalism rather than his opinion on the merit of medical marijuana. In 2007, after Raich was decided by the Supreme Court, Angel Raich sued Alberto Gonzales again for substantive due process violation because the Controlled Substance Law deprived her fundamental right to life. Pregerson ruled against Raich this time, arguing it is still untimely to call using medical marijuana a "fundamental right" that is "implicit in the concept of ordered liberty" as only a minority of states legalized medical marijuana.

In the case United States v. Reynard, the circuit court upheld the DNA Analysis Backlog Elimination Act of 2000. Pregerson wrote a dissent, arguing that the act was an unconstitutional exercise of federal power.

=== Gender equality ===
Pregerson wrote a dissenting opinion in Jespersen v. Harrah's Operating Co., which was joined by judges Alex Kozinski, Susan P. Graber, and William A. Fletcher. The majority ruled that Jespersen had not shown sufficient evidence that Harrah's "Personal Best" policy, which required women but not men to wear makeup, was sex discrimination. Pregerson disagreed: "Harrah's regarded women as unable to achieve a neat, attractive, and professional appearance without the facial uniform designed by a consultant and required by Harrah's. The inescapable message is that women's undoctored faces compare unfavorably to men's, not because of a physical difference between men's and women's faces, but because of a cultural assumption—and gender-based stereotype—that women's faces are incomplete, unattractive, or unprofessional without full makeup. Therefore, I strongly disagree with the majority's conclusion that there 'is no evidence in this record to indicate that the policy was adopted to make women bartenders conform to a commonly-accepted stereotypical image of what women should wear'."

=== Legal responses to draft evasion during the Vietnam War ===
In the case of the United States of America vs. Robert Paul Zaugh, which occurred in 1970, Pregerson presided over the trial. The prosecution argued that Zaugh had violated the Selective Service Act by refusing to report for a preinduction physical examination and military induction during the Vietnam War. The prosecution presented evidence from Zaugh's Selective Service file, emphasizing that he had been given clear instructions and opportunities to comply with the draft process. They contended that Zaugh's refusal was a willful violation of federal law, and sought a conviction based on his noncompliance.

In contrast, Zaugh defended himself by admitting to the charges but asserting that he was compelled by conscience to resist the draft, arguing that the draft infringed upon his constitutional rights. He cited the Ninth Amendment and referenced the Declaration of Independence to support his claim that the draft was an infringement on individual liberties. Zaugh's defense was somewhat hampered by procedural objections raised by the prosecution, which argued that his philosophical arguments were irrelevant to the charges.

After hearing both sides, Pregerson acquitted Zaugh of the more serious charge of refusing induction but found him guilty of failing to report for the physical examination. In his reasoning, Pregerson acknowledged Zaugh's sincerity and recognized the changing public attitudes towards the Vietnam War, indicating that he believed incarceration was not warranted for Zaugh. Instead, he sentenced Zaugh to two years of probation with the condition that he perform civilian work contributing to national health and safety. This decision reflected Pregerson's inclination to balance legal obligations with individual circumstances and societal context.

=== Civil procedure ===
In 2007, Pregerson wrote the panel majority decision that affirmed the class action certification in Dukes v. Wal-Mart Stores, Inc., a case involving female employees suing Wal-Mart Corporation for gender discrimination. He wrote that although the class action suit had a massive class, "mere size does not render the case unmanageable." The decision did not address the employees' claim but only affirmed its class action status. Wal-Mart stated that it would seek an appeal. The decision was then reheard by an en banc panel of the Ninth Circuit, which also narrowly upheld class certification, but certification was ultimately reversed by the Supreme Court.

== Honors ==
In 2002, the California Legislature named the freeway interchange between I-110 and I-105 as the "Judge Harry Pregerson Interchange" in honor of Pregerson, the longest-serving judge in the history of the Ninth Circuit. When district judge, he supervised the settlement of the federal lawsuit against the Century Freeway, enabling the construction of the interchange. Judge Pregerson's name is now on signs at the interchange. In 1992 the UCLA Alumni Association awarded Pregerson "Community Service Award" for his efforts helping homeless families to house in Salvation Army shelters.

As a World War II veteran, Pregerson was an advocate for veterans' interests, and has worked on behalf of homeless veterans. In 2001, the Department of Veterans Affairs honored him and the then-Acting Secretary Hershel Gober and presented Pregerson with a token of appreciation with the VA seal.

== Personal life ==
His wife, Bernardine, was a microbiologist. They had two children, son Dean Pregerson, a federal district judge for the United States District Court for the Central District of California, and daughter Katie Rodan, a dermatologist and co-founder of a skin-care brand. Pregerson died on November 25, 2017, from respiratory problems.

== See also ==
- List of Jewish American jurists
- List of United States federal judges by longevity of service

Legal offices
Preceded by Seat established by 80 Stat. 75	Judge of the United States District Court for the Central District of California; 1967–1979	Succeeded by Cynthia Holcomb Hall
Preceded by Seat established by 92 Stat. 1629	Judge of the United States Court of Appeals for the Ninth Circuit; 1979–2015	Succeeded by Daniel P. Collins
