= Bizrate Insights =

Market research company

Bizrate Insights Inc.
- Type: Subsidiary
- Industry: Market research
- Founded: 1996; 30 years ago in Los Angeles, California, United States
- Founder: Farhad Mohit, Henri Asseily
- Headquarters: Stamford, Connecticut, United States
- Products: Online ratings
- Parent: People Inc.

Bizrate Insights Inc. is a U.S.-based market research firm specializing in consumer-generated insights for online and omnichannel retailers. Its feedback solutions have been widely adopted by retailers seeking to better understand shopper behavior, improve user experience, and benchmark performance against industry standards.

Services include customer surveys with unlimited responses, verified ratings and reviews, retail benchmarking, and reporting tools. Bizrate Insights is also among the third-party review partners supported by Google, allowing participating retailers’ reviews to contribute to Google Store Ratings.

Founded in 1996, Bizrate Insights is headquartered in Stamford, Connecticut, and operates as a subsidiary of People Inc.

== History ==
Binary Compass Enterprises, later Bizrate, was founded in June 1996 by classmates at the University of California Los Angeles and Wharton School of Business, Farhad Mohit and Henri Asseily based on a school project they authored while attending the Wharton School of the University of Pennsylvania.

The first retailer reviews were collected in 1997 after launching and rebranding the website as Bizrate.com. Services were later expanded to include comparison shopping. In 1999, Bizrate partnered with Consumer Reports to provide ratings in both the print and online editions of the Consumer Reports.

In 2004, Bizrate rebranded to Shopzilla.

In June 2005, E.W. Scripps acquired Shopzilla, which included all operating websites and Bizrate Insights. In June 2011, Symphony Technology Group acquired Shopzilla, including all operating websites and Bizrate Insights. In September 2014, Shopzilla.com rebranded to Connexity, Inc.; Bizrate Insights continued to operate under the Connexity umbrella. In June 2015, Connexity acquired PriceGrabber. Customer feedback collected under PriceGrabber was then collected by Bizrate Insights. In September 2016, The Bizrate Insights division of Connexity is acquired by Synapse Group Inc., a division of Time Inc.

In 2010, Bizrate Insights formed a partnership with Google to begin distributing retailer ratings and reviews from Bizrate Insights to Google Product Search and Google AdWords ads.
