= Kathy A. Fields =

American dermatologist (born 1958)

- Born: 1958 (age 67–68)
- Education: University of Florida; Miller School of Medicine, University of Miami; Stanford University School of Medicine
- Known for: Co-Founder of Proactiv. Co-founder, Rodan + Fields
- Partner: Married
- Children: 2
- Scientific career
- Fields: Dermatology

Kathy A. Fields is a dermatologist with a private practice located in San Francisco, California. She is also the co-creator of Proactiv and co-founder of Rodan + Fields. In 2018, Forbes listed her as number eighteen on its list of "America's Self-Made Women".

== Early life and education ==
Fields had two siblings. Her father was an ophthalmologist.

Fields started her secondary education at Northwestern University, then transferred to the University of Florida, where she completed her BS in Neurobiological Chemistry. Following her undergraduate degree, Fields attended the University of Miami School of Medicine for a degree in medicine. She then completed her dermatology residency at the Stanford University School of Medicine.

== Career ==
Fields opened her private practice in 1987, located in San Francisco.

In the 1990s, Fields and Katie Rodan created the acne treatment Proactiv.

In 2002, Fields and Rodan created the business Rodan + Fields, which primarily sold anti-aging products.

Fields is also an Assistant Professor of Dermatology at University of California, San Francisco.

== Publications ==
Fields has published several books, as well as some publications in different scientific journals.

- “Unblemished: Stop Breakouts! Fight Acne! Transform Your Life! Reclaim Your Self-Esteem with the Proven 3-Step Program Using Over-the-Counter Medications” (2004)
- “Write Your Skin a Prescription for Change" (2009)
- "Apparatus and Method For Removing Material from Skin Pores" (2000)
