= A. Wallace Tashima =

American judge (born 1934)

Wallace Tashima
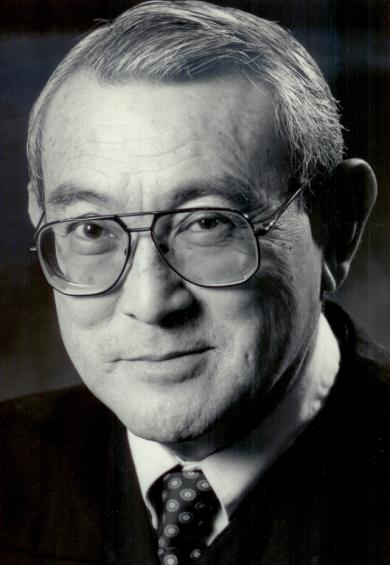

Senior Judge of the United States Court of Appeals for the Ninth Circuit
- Incumbent
- Assumed office June 30, 2004

Judge of the United States Court of Appeals for the Ninth Circuit
- In office January 4, 1996 – June 30, 2004
- Appointed by: Bill Clinton
- Preceded by: Arthur Alarcón
- Succeeded by: Milan Smith

Judge of the United States District Court for the Central District of California
- In office June 30, 1980 – January 8, 1996
- Appointed by: Jimmy Carter
- Preceded by: Warren J. Ferguson
- Succeeded by: Dean Pregerson

Personal details
- Born: Atsushi Wallace Tashima; June 24, 1934 (age 91) Santa Maria, California, U.S.
- Children: 3, including Chris
- Education: University of California, Los Angeles (BA); Harvard University (LLB)

Military service
- Allegiance: United States
- Branch/service: United States Marine Corps
- Years of service: 1953–1956
- Rank: Sergeant

Atsushi Wallace Tashima (Japanese: 田島 篤, born June 24, 1934) is a Senior United States circuit judge of the United States Court of Appeals for the Ninth Circuit and a former United States District Judge of the United States District Court for the Central District of California. He is the third Asian American and first Japanese American to be appointed to a United States Court of Appeals.

== Early life ==
Atsushi Wallace Tashima was born in 1934 in Santa Maria, California, to Yasutaro and Aya Tashima. He is Nisei Japanese American. During World War II he was interned at the Poston War Relocation Center in Arizona, an internment camp for Japanese Americans. After the war his family moved to Southern California. He lived in Boyle Heights, graduating from Roosevelt High School in East Los Angeles. From 1953 to 1956, Tashima served in the United States Marine Corps, and was honorably discharged with the rank of sergeant. He received a Bachelor of Arts degree from the University of California, Los Angeles in 1958, and a Bachelor of Laws from the Harvard Law School in 1961.

== Career ==
Upon graduation from law school, from 1962 to 1968, Tashima became the Deputy State Attorney General for the State of California. He then joined the Amstar Corporation as an attorney in its Spreckels Sugar Division (1968–1972) and then as the general attorney and vice president of Amstar from 1972 to 1977. Tashima returned to private practice in 1977, as a partner at Morrison & Foerster, in Los Angeles.

== Federal judicial service ==
Tashima was nominated by President Jimmy Carter on May 9, 1980, to a seat on the United States District Court for the Central District of California vacated by Judge Warren J. Ferguson. He was confirmed by the United States Senate on June 26, 1980, and received commission on June 30, 1980. His service terminated on January 8, 1996, due to elevation to the Ninth Circuit.

Tashima was nominated by President Bill Clinton on April 6, 1995, to a seat on the United States Court of Appeals for the Ninth Circuit vacated by Judge Arthur Alarcón. He was confirmed by the Senate on January 2, 1996, and received commission on January 4, 1996. He assumed senior status on June 30, 2004.

== Notable cases ==
- Donald Walden Jr. v. the State of Nevada: On December 23, 2019, Judge Tashima ruled in favor of workers that were not paid for overtime work. In the ruling, Tashima also ruled that a state waives its 11th Amendment rights when taking the case to federal court.
- East Bay Sanctuary Covenant v. Barr, No. 19-16487 (9th Cir. Aug. 16, 2019): Judge Tashima partially dissented when the Ninth Circuit held 2-1 that President Trump's asylum ban could take place in New Mexico and Texas but not California or Arizona. Tashima would have blocked the asylum ban in all four states.
- Flores v. Barr, No. 17-56297 (9th Cir. Aug. 15, 2019): Judge Tashima was in a unanimous decision (with Marsha S. Berzon and William A. Fletcher) that ruled that detained migrant children must get sleep, soap, and clean water.
- the United States v. Neal Bain, No. 17-10107 (9th Cir. June 11, 2019): Writing for a unanimous panel, Judge Tashima overturned a conviction for armed bank robbery. He held that the defendant's inadvertent placement of a closed pocket knife on a bank counter did not constitute "armed" bank robbery because this action did not "put[] in jeopardy the life of any person by the use of a dangerous weapon," which is a requirement for armed bank robbery under 18 U.S.C. § 2113(d).
- On March 8, 2019, Judge Tashima ruled that asylum seekers are entitled to habeas review and have the right to appeal their deportations.
- United States v. Sineneng-Smith, No. 15-10614 (9th Cir. Dec. 4, 2018): Writing for a unanimous panel, Judge Tashima struck down a statute as unconstitutionally overbroad in violation of the First Amendment. The panel held that 8 U.S.C. § 1324(a)(1)(A)(iv)—which permits a felony prosecution of any person who "encourages or induces" an alien to come to, enter, or reside in the United States if the encourager knew, or recklessly disregarded the fact that such coming to, entry, or residence is or will be in violation of law—was unconstitutional because it criminalizes a substantial amount of protected expression in relation to its narrow band of legitimately prohibited conduct and unprotected expression. Tashima wrote, "At the very least, it is clear that the statute potentially criminalizes the simple words – spoken to a son, a wife, a parent, a friend, a neighbor, a coworker, a student, a client – 'I encourage you to stay here.'" He also wrote that the statute appeared to apply to statements amounting to "pure advocacy on a hotly debated issue in our society." This decision was unanimously overturned by the US Supreme Court.
- González v. Douglas: While sitting by designation in the United States District Court of Arizona, Judge Tashima ruled that Arizona school officials were motivated by racial animus when they acted to shut down a Mexican-American studies program in Tucson's public schools.

== Personal life ==
Tashima is married and has three children and three grandchildren. He resides in Los Angeles. He is the father of Academy Award-winning filmmaker and actor Chris Tashima.

== Awards ==
- Trial Jurist of the Year, Los Angeles County Bar Association (1995–96)

== See also ==
- List of Asian American jurists
- List of first minority male lawyers and judges in the United States

== Sources ==
- A. Wallace Tashima profile on metnews.com

Legal offices
| Preceded by Warren J. Ferguson | Judge of the United States District Court for the Central District of California; 1980–1996 | Succeeded by Dean Pregerson |
| Preceded by Arthur Alarcón | Judge of the United States Court of Appeals for the Ninth Circuit; 1996–2004 | Succeeded by Milan Smith |
