= Daniel P. Collins =

American federal judge (born 1963)

Daniel Collins
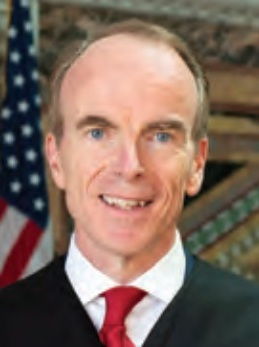

Judge of the United States Court of Appeals for the Ninth Circuit
- Incumbent
- Assumed office May 22, 2019
- Appointed by: Donald Trump
- Preceded by: Harry Pregerson

Personal details
- Born: Daniel Paul Collins; 1963 (age 62–63) New York City, New York, U.S.
- Education: Harvard University (BA); Stanford University (JD)

Daniel Paul Collins (born 1963) is an American lawyer and jurist serving as a United States circuit judge of the United States Court of Appeals for the Ninth Circuit. He was appointed in 2019 by President Donald Trump.

== Early life and education ==
Collins earned his Bachelor of Arts, summa cum laude, from Harvard College. He received his Juris Doctor from Stanford Law School in 1988, where he served on the Stanford Law Review. After graduating from law school, Collins served as a law clerk to Ninth Circuit judge Dorothy Wright Nelson from 1988 to 1989 and to Justice Antonin Scalia of the Supreme Court of the United States from 1991 to 1992.

== Career ==
Collins then worked as an assistant United States attorney for the Central District of California and as an attorney-advisor in the United States Department of Justice Office of Legal Counsel. He later served as an Associate United States Deputy Attorney General and in that role participated substantially in the drafting of the PROTECT Act of 2003. From 2003 to 2019, Collins was a partner at Munger, Tolles & Olson. In 2007, he was considered but not chosen for the position of United States Attorney for the Central District of California. In 2009, he represented Phillip Morris in opposing a ban on tobacco sales in drug stores in San Francisco. In 2017, he served on the Federal Courts Advisory Committee on Evidence Rules.

=== Federal judicial service ===
On October 10, 2018, President Donald Trump announced his intent to nominate Collins to serve as a United States circuit judge of the United States Court of Appeals for the Ninth Circuit. On October 11, 2018, Senator Dianne Feinstein said the White House had not consulted her on the nomination, and that she would oppose Senate confirmation of Collins and two other circuit court nominees. On November 13, 2018, his nomination was sent to the Senate. President Trump nominated Collins to the seat vacated by Judge Harry Pregerson, who assumed senior status on December 11, 2015. On January 3, 2019, his nomination was returned to the President under Rule XXXI, Paragraph 6 of the United States Senate.

On January 30, 2019, President Trump indicated that he would renominate Collins to a Ninth Circuit vacancy. On February 6, 2019, his nomination was sent to the Senate. On March 13, 2019, a hearing on his nomination was held before the Senate Judiciary Committee. On April 4, 2019, his nomination was reported out of committee by a 12–10 vote. On May 20, 2019, the Senate invoked cloture on his nomination by a 51–43 vote, and on the following day, May 21, the Senate confirmed his nomination by a 53–46 vote. He received his judicial commission on May 22, 2019.

In the early months after his confirmation, some other Ninth Circuit judges complained that Collins was failing to follow court rules and objecting to other judges' rulings in language that colleagues found combative. Collins also quickly moved to challenge rulings made by his colleagues on three-judge panels. Several judges claimed it was unprecedented for a new jurist to try to overturn so many decisions from colleagues within such a short period of time.

== Notable cases ==
- On May 22, 2020, Collins dissented in a 2–1 decision which ruled that California Governor Gavin Newsom's order to close churches was constitutional. On May 29, a majority on the U.S. Supreme Court declined to overrule the 9th Circuit's ruling. However, the issue had shifted from whether closing churches was constitutional to whether limiting church capacity was constitutional.
- On June 26, 2020, Collins again dissented in a pair of 2–1 decisions ruling that President Trump illegally redirected $2.5 billion in military funds to build portions of a border wall in California, Arizona, and New Mexico.
- On April 27, 2021, Collins partially dissented in a Qualified immunity case where a 13 year old was coerced into confessing a murder that he did not commit. While the majority granted the officers qualified immunity in part, Collins would have granted them it in full.
- In Brach v. Newsom, Collins ruled that private schools were exempt from COVID-19 restrictions.

== See also ==
- List of law clerks for the ninth seat of the Supreme Court of the United States

== Selected publications ==
- Collins, Daniel P. (1997). "Lewis v. Casey: A Case Study in How Standing Doctrines Help to Promote Judicial Restraint". Federalism & Separation of Powers Practice Group Newsletter. 1 (2). The Federalist Society.
- Collins, Daniel P. (1996–1997). "Making Juries Better Factfinders". Harv. J. L. & Pub. Pol'y. 20: 489. Hein paid access.

Legal offices
Preceded by Harry Pregerson	Judge of the United States Court of Appeals for the Ninth Circuit; 2019–present	Incumbent
