= Jean-Louis Sebagh =

Algerian-born French cosmetic doctor (born c. 1954)

- Born: c. 1954 (age 71–72); Algeria
- Education: University of Paris (graduated 1979))
- Known for: Cosmetic surgeon; Works with cancer patients and burns victims; Developing and marketing cosmetics
- Medical career
- Profession: Doctor
- Institutions: Foch Hospital, Private Practices in Paris and London.
- Sub-specialties: Plastic/Cosmetic surgery

Jean-Louis Sebagh is an Algerian-born French cosmetic surgeon and doctor who is known for his anti-aging surgeries, and use of botox, collagen and vitamin injections specifically on the face and neck.

Sebagh's high profile clients including numerous celebrities, models and socialites include Cindy Crawford, Elle McPherson and Kylie Minogue. and he has offices in Paris and London.

== Biography and career ==
Born in Algeria, Sebagh obtained a medical degree from the University of Paris and then learned plastic surgery in Los Angeles. For around 15 years, he worked to rebuild cancer victims' faces and heal burns victims' scarring in Paris's Hôpital Foch.

In 1997, he divorced his wife, a Parisian dentist. He has a son and a daughter.

Sebagh has a line of skin care products called Dr. Sebagh Anti-Aging marketed by Californian-based direct sales company Guthy-Renker and promoted through TV infomercials.

== Selected boards ==
- French Society of Aesthetic Cosmetic and Surgery
- President of French Medical Laser Clinic

== Honours ==
- European Elite 1000 inductee
