= John W. Holcomb =

American judge (born 1963)

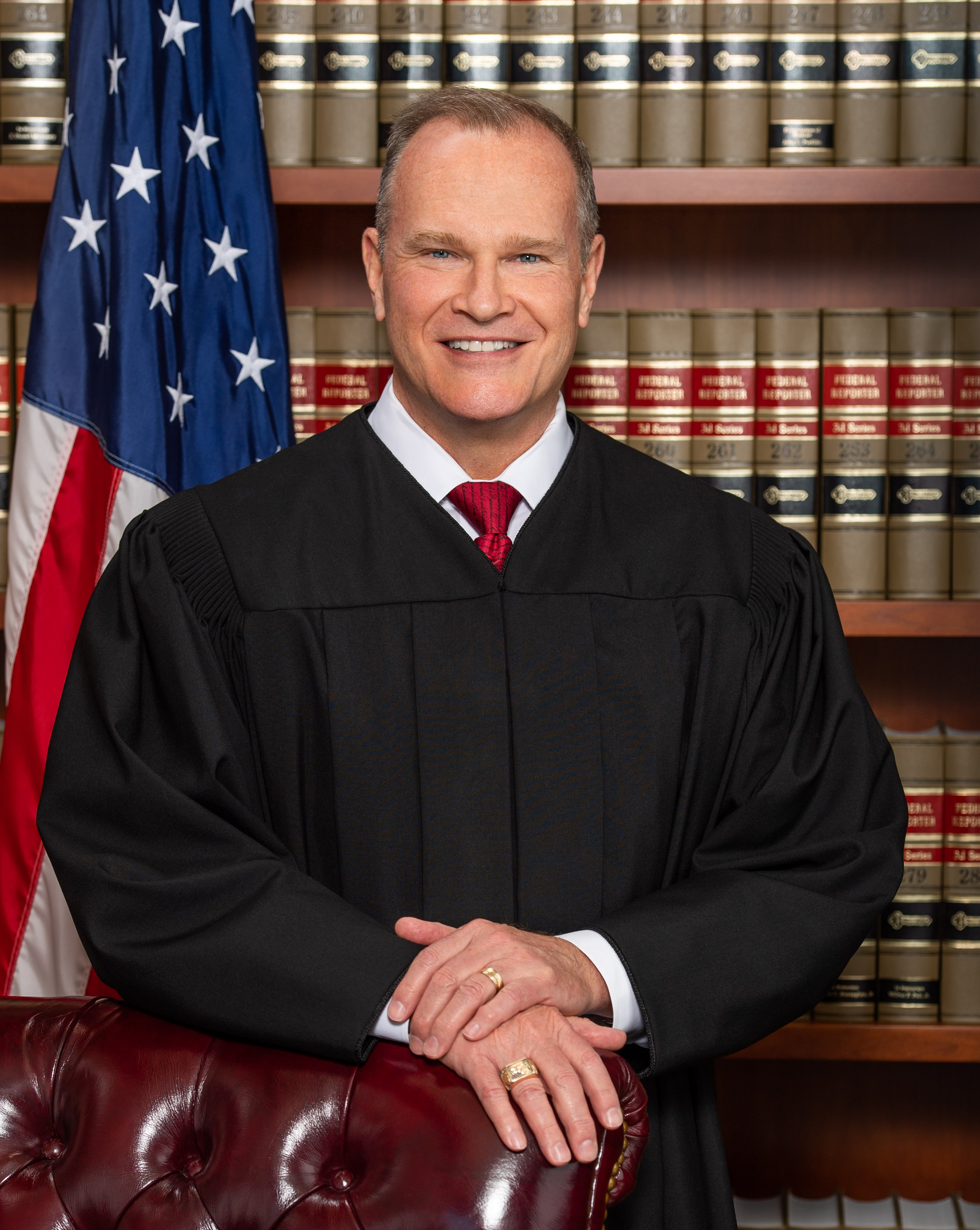

Judge of the United States District Court for the Central District of California
- Incumbent
- Assumed office September 18, 2020
- Appointed by: Donald Trump
- Preceded by: Dean Pregerson

Personal details
- Born: John William Holcomb; 1963 (age 62–63) Olean, New York, U.S.
- Education: Massachusetts Institute of Technology (SB); Harvard University (JD–MBA)

Military service
- Allegiance: United States
- Branch/service: United States Navy
- Years of service: 1984–1989
- Rank: Lieutenant
- Unit: USS New Jersey (BB-62)
- Awards: See list: Joint Service Commendation Medal Navy E Ribbon Sea Service Deployment Ribbon Pistol Marksmanship Medal

John William Holcomb (born 1963) is a United States district judge of the United States District Court for the Central District of California.

== Early life and education ==
Holcomb was born in 1963 in Olean, New York. He attended Massachusetts Institute of Technology on a Naval Reserve Officers Training Corps scholarship, graduating in 1984 with a Scientiae Baccalaureus in civil engineering. He spent five years as an active duty military officer, then jointly attended Harvard Law School and Harvard Business School, receiving a JD–MBA in 1993. Holcomb received his Juris Doctor degree with cum laude honors.

== Military service ==
Holcomb served in the United States Navy from 1980 to 1989, and he was on active duty as a commissioned officer from 1984 to 1989. His service included time as a Surface Warfare Officer aboard the battleship USS New Jersey (BB-62) and with the Joint Chiefs of Staff at the Pentagon.

== Career ==
After receiving his JD–MBA, Holcomb served as a law clerk to Judge Ronald Barliant of the United States Bankruptcy Court for the Northern District of Illinois from 1993 to 1994. From 1994 to 1997, he was an associate with Irell & Manella. He practiced intellectual property law at Knobbe Martens from 1997 to 2018. In 2019 he was briefly a sole practitioner, before joining Greenberg Gross in Costa Mesa, California, where he focused on intellectual property and bankruptcy litigation. He left Greenberg Gross after becoming a federal judge.

=== Federal judicial service ===
On September 20, 2019, President Donald Trump announced his intent to nominate Holcomb to serve as a United States district judge of the United States District Court for the Central District of California. On November 21, 2019, his nomination was sent to the Senate. President Trump nominated Holcomb to the seat vacated by Judge Dean Pregerson, who assumed senior status on January 28, 2016. On January 3, 2020, his nomination was returned to the President under Rule XXXI, Paragraph 6 of the United States Senate. On February 13, 2020, his renomination was sent to the Senate. On June 17, 2020, a hearing on his nomination was held before the Senate Judiciary Committee. On July 23, 2020, his nomination was reported out of committee by a voice vote. On September 15, 2020, the Senate invoked cloture on his nomination by an 83–13 vote. His nomination was confirmed later that day by an 83–12 vote. He received his judicial commission on September 18, 2020.

Legal offices
Preceded by Dean Pregerson	Judge of the United States District Court for the Central District of California; 2020–present	Incumbent
