= Columbia House =

Mail-order music club brand by Columbia Records

- Type: Private
- Industry: Direct-to-consumer distributor of DVDs and Blu-ray and LaserDisc
- Founded: 1955; 71 years ago
- Founder: Columbia Records
- Defunct: September 15, 2026
- Fate: Bankruptcy
- Headquarters: New York, New York, United States
- Area served: United States; Canada (until December 2010); Mexico (until April 2001)
- Products: Movies; Music (formerly)
- Owner: Sony Group Corporation
- Parent: Edge Line Ventures; Sony Music
- Website: columbiahouse.com

Logo until 2008

Columbia House is an online retail operation. It was formerly an umbrella brand for Columbia Records' mail-order music clubs, the primary iteration of which was the Columbia Record Club, established in 1955. The Columbia House brand was introduced in the early 1970s by Columbia Records (a division of CBS, Inc.), and had a significant market presence in the 1970s, 1980s and early 1990s.

In 2005, longtime competitor BMG Direct Marketing, Inc. (formerly the RCA Music Service or RCA Victor Record Club) purchased Columbia House and consolidated operations. In 2008, the company (as well as book club operator Bookspan) was acquired by private investment group Najafi Companies, and its name was changed to Direct Brands, Inc.

Although Direct Brands shut down music mail-order operations in mid-2009, it continued to use the Columbia House brand to market videos in the U.S. and Canada, selling DVDs and Blu-rays via the controversial practice of negative option billing. DB Media's Canadian assets ceased operating on December 10, 2010, and all staff were dismissed, while U.S. operations continued as usual. In December 2012, the company was sold to Pride Tree Holdings, Inc. In 2013, the company changed its name to Filmed Entertainment Inc. The sale of the DVD division at bankruptcy auction was announced August 10, 2015.

Columbia House announced it would take its last orders in September 2026.

== History ==
=== Rapid growth ===
Columbia Record Club was formed in 1955 by CBS/Columbia Records as an experiment to market music directly by mail, spurring sales to rural consumers and heading off competition from mail-order companies from outside the record industry. New members to the club were enticed with a free record just for joining. To appease brick-and-mortar retailers, titles in the club's catalog were not made available until six months after retail release (later reduced to three months), and retailers that helped recruit members got a 20% commission. By the end of that year, the club had 125,175 members who had purchased 700,000 records ($1.174 million net). The operation grew so quickly that, in 1956, it was moved from New York City to a new home base: a distribution center in Terre Haute, Indiana, a railway-accessible city where Columbia had recently opened a record pressing facility. Within a year, the club had 687,652 members and had sold 7 million records ($14.888 million net) and, by 1963, it commanded 10% of the recorded music retail market.

=== Licensing ===
In the late 1950s, both RCA Victor and Capitol Records also launched record clubs. Initially, the three record clubs sold only their own labels' releases. For example, Columbia recordings were not available from the RCA Victor Record Club, and RCA recordings were unavailable through the Columbia Record Club.

In 1958, facing the loss of members who wanted a wider variety of records, the Columbia Record Club began manufacturing and marketing records for some smaller competing labels, including Verve, Mercury, Warner Bros., Kapp, Vanguard, United Artists, and Liberty. The RCA Victor and Capitol record clubs continued to offer only their own labels' products. Licensors were guaranteed a minimum number of sales, but were held to exclusive, restrictive contracts, which led to price-fixing allegations against the club in 1962, followed by 7 years of mostly ineffective litigation. The licensing program continued and expanded in the 1960s as the music industry grew and changed.

=== New formats and the rise of the Columbia House brand ===
The Columbia Record Club began marketing stereo records and equipment in 1959, reel-to-reel recordings (via the Columbia Reel-To-Reel Club) in 1960, 8-track cartridges (via the Columbia Cartridge Club) in 1966, and cassettes (via the Columbia Cassette Club) in 1969.

The Columbia Record Club was also notable in continuing to issue product in formats no longer available on the commercial market. After the major record labels discontinued the reel-to-reel tape format in the mid 1970s, Columbia continued to offer select new titles available on reel tape until 1984. The 8-track tape had mostly disappeared by 1982, yet Columbia continued to release new titles in the format until 1988. Finally, after the major record labels abandoned the vinyl LP format in 1989, Columbia issued select new titles on vinyl until 1992. In all three cases, the new releases on the deleted formats were usually limited to the new Selection of the Month title (although the country music Selection of the Month had never been available on reel tape unless the album had possible crossover appeal to the Pop/Rock or Easy Listening club members).

By the early 1970s, "Columbia House" had become an overarching brand for the various divisions, led by the Columbia Record Club, later renamed the Columbia Record & Tape Club. By 1975, membership was over 3 million.

A small CRC was in a conspicuous spot on the media and the cover, which showed that Columbia House was the manufacturer.

In 1982, the CBS Video Club, which had formed the previous year as the CBS Video Library, became part of the Columbia House family. Also, during that same time period, Columbia House and The Cannon Group founded the UK-exclusive mail-order VHS distribution service Videolog. Sony acquired the CBS Records Group, including Columbia House, in 1988, then at 6 million members. In 1987, BMG had acquired RCA Records and changed the name of Columbia House's only surviving rival, RCA Music Service (formerly RCA Victor Record Club), to BMG Music Service.

In 1991, the CBS Records Group was renamed Sony Music Entertainment, and Sony sold half of Columbia House to Time Warner, which contributed Time Life's video and music clubs to the joint venture. Membership was over 10 million at the end of that year. The influence of Columbia House and other music clubs reached its peak in 1994, accounting for 15.1 percent of all CD sales. In 1996, club membership was at 16 million. That year, the Columbia House website was launched.

Meanwhile, a parallel club, the Columbia Record Club of Canada, was operated by the Canadian branch of Columbia Records from the late 1950s until membership and financial problems led to its apparent demise in 1977. It was relaunched in 1979 as the Canadian Music Club, attracting 100,000 members by the end of that year.

=== Market decline ===
In mid-1999, a merger was announced between Columbia House and struggling online retailer CDNow, an independent, publicly owned company that had funding and other partnerships with Columbia House and its owners Sony and Time-Warner. The merger was abandoned in early 2000, with Columbia House's poor finances and stiff competition from online giant Amazon.com cited as factors. Within months, CDNow was purchased by Bertelsmann, which partially merged it with BMG Direct into a venture called BeMusic. CDNow was taken over and merged into Amazon the following year. By 2001, music clubs accounted for less than eight percent of all CD sales, coinciding with the ascent of Internet shops and retail outlets such as Amazon and Wal-Mart, which offered music at similar discounts without subscriptions.

=== Security breach ===
In 2001, a security breach in the Columbia House website exposed thousands of customer names, addresses and portions of credit card numbers, leaving private information about customers vulnerable to exploitation. The issue involved a particular section of the website, which could easily be accessed by deleting a portion of the website address in the address bar, discovered by customer Mark Alway. Upon the discovery of the breach, he emailed the Columbia House staff who were quick to respond to the problem. This event gave rise to concerns over the website's capability of keeping private information secure from hackers or devastating scams. Although no information was reportedly obtained from the temporary breach according to Columbia House, industry professionals were quick to point out that the simple error was the consequence of negligent handling of customer information.

=== Consolidation and downsizing ===
In 2002, Sony and AOL Time Warner sold 85% of Columbia House to The Blackstone Group L.P., a New York-based investment firm. The next year, the possibility of a merger of Columbia House and Blockbuster Inc. was reported in the Wall Street Journal, Associated Press reports, and trade publications. Although the owners were said to be in talks, the merger never materialized.

In 2005, longtime competitor BMG Direct Marketing, Inc., then the current owners of BMG Music Service, acquired Columbia House, renamed the merged company BMG Columbia House, Inc., and consolidated operations under the BMG Music Service name.

In 2008, the company, including its Canadian branch, was acquired from BMG by investment firm JMCK Corp., a Najafi Group company based in Phoenix, Arizona, and the name was changed to Direct Brands, Inc. Direct Brands consolidated the remaining facilities, and shut down music mail-order operations on June 30, 2009. However, Direct Brands continued to operate a DVD and Blu-ray Disc club under the Columbia House brand in both the U.S. and Canada. The Columbia House name is still owned by Sony Music Entertainment, and is used under license.

In December 2010, the Canadian branch went into bankruptcy, and its websites began redirecting visitors to a letter of explanation from the companies' trustees in bankruptcy.

=== Bankruptcy ===
The parent of the Columbia House music and DVD clubs announced on August 10, 2015, that it plans to sell its Columbia House DVD Club business, which sells recorded movies and TV series directly to consumers, through a bankruptcy auction.

=== Return to music sales ===
In December 2015, Columbia House's owner, John Lippman, announced his intention to begin a vinyl subscription service that will allow subscribers the ability to choose which records and genres of music they receive.

=== Current ownership ===
While Sony Music still owns the Columbia House trademark, Edge Line Ventures LLC is the current licensee of the Columbia House name.

== Business practices ==
Since Columbia House's beginnings, following the sale of Columbia House to BMG, and continuing after the sale to Direct Brands, Columbia House has attracted criticism for its business practices, some of which are outlined here:

=== Membership ===
During the first three decades of Columbia House, it had a most unique marketing strategy: Give the customer several albums for free (although most of its early marketing campaigns required the customer to tape a penny to the enclosed postcard/order form) with the promise that they would purchase a set number of records or tapes at full club prices plus shipping.

There were dozens of small sheets of stamps that were enclosed in the mailer; these stamps had pictures of the actual album cover of the records offered by Columbia House. The customer would tear the stamp off the sheet, moisten the stamp and affix them onto the order card.

These Columbia House envelopes would arrive as junk mail to countless homes on a regular basis. One recipient might get one type of offer, but a neighbor might receive a more lucrative offer. Many times, the teenagers of the house intercepted this mail. They were easily suckered in with the idea of getting the albums they wanted all at once; all they had to do was to buy three or four albums within the next two or three years. There were many underage customers who legally could not be bound to this agreement. Columbia House knew these were unenforceable, but they apparently did not care; however, this policy did eventually change. Columbia House (and other music clubs) made it extremely easy to defraud them. There were countless cases of customers joining the music club, receiving free albums and never ordering more albums at full price as agreed. Customers would join the club several times under different names with no intention of paying—in extreme cases receiving recordings with a retail value of hundreds of thousands of dollars.

=== Negative option billing practice ===
Columbia House practiced negative option billing, a form of commercial distribution in which services are automatically supplied to the consumers until a specific cancellation order is issued. The practice has drawn many complaints from consumers. The Federal Trade Commission has published information to protect customers against this practice, specifically referencing a $0.49/video offering.

==== Other questionable business practices ====
In specified circumstances, "memberships" are available, whereby the customer is not required to respond to Director Selection mailings unless he or she wants to buy the movie. When such memberships expire, the old rules return where a response is required in time to prevent shipping of full-price movies without customer input. Customers are not reminded when those rules change. The customer also has access to a large variety of other movies, which are advertised by mail and online towards the customer. Only full-price purchases deplete that minimum purchase obligation. Purchases are not cumulative, meaning that two movies bought at ten dollars each do not deplete the minimum list price movie purchases by one movie. If the minimum number of movies has not been purchased by the end of the term, the monetary worth of those movies is charged to the customers' accounts. If any purchases have been made using Columbia House's point of sale device, either credit cards or debit cards linked to credit card accounts, then those accounts are automatically debited. The company will either mail or email a reminder notice prior to the commitment expiring, giving the customer the opportunity to purchase the required purchase obligation before they are charged for any commitment or contract charges. Likewise, backordered movies are automatically debited to those accounts when they become available, without further notification to the customers. Failure to clear such purchases result in collections efforts by Columbia House against the customers.

=== Alleged fraudulent sale of debt ===
In December 2008, BMG Music Service (in December 2008, as yourmusic.com) supposedly sold an unknown number of fraudulent debt claims to a collection agency, National Credit Solutions. Supposed delinquents were not made known of their debt and most had not made purchases with the company for at least five years. Victims of the sale of false debt claims were not made known of either their debt or the account opened with National Credit Solutions. Most victims learned of the collections agency account when they were denied a loan, had credit cards canceled, or checked their credit reports.

BMG Music Service parent Direct Brands confirmed on 23 December 2008 that they stopped accepting new members.

=== Class action suit ===
On August 4, 2011, a nationwide class action was filed against Columbia House (Direct Brands Inc.) seeking monetary damages and an injunction stopping Direct Brands Inc. alleged business practices of unauthorized credit card charges, inability to cancel, unwanted products being mailed to homes and several other alleged issues.

=== "Fun Cash", "Dividend Dollars" and "Bonus Points" ===
Columbia House offered a point system, where movies bought resulted in "points" or "Fun Cash" ("Dividend Dollars" was the term used when the movies came in VHS format). There were a number of restrictions to the use of Fun Cash, which generally made regular re-enrollment a lower cost and more tangible option for those interested in savings.

=== Other clubs ===
Columbia House has made forays into media besides music and movies. For a few years, Columbia House offered a CD-ROM club, allowing customers to buy computer games. It once allowed members to buy video games from its site, but did not offer a specific club for this. One could also agree to the regular purchase of box sets of popular TV series. One agreement allows customers access to any of Columbia House's products. Everything can be sourced via the company website.

== Better Business Bureau rating ==
In 2010, this business had an unsatisfactory rating with the Better Business Bureau because of a failure to respond to complaints. The company also has an unsatisfactory record because of a pattern of complaints. Specifically, complainants allege receiving merchandise and/or bills for merchandise from BMG/Columbia House for products they did not order. Complainants further allege that they did not join BMG/Columbia House and do not know how the company obtained their information and that the company's phone line and website do not provide live customer service representatives to help resolve these problems.
