= Arthur Alarcón =

American judge (1925–2015)

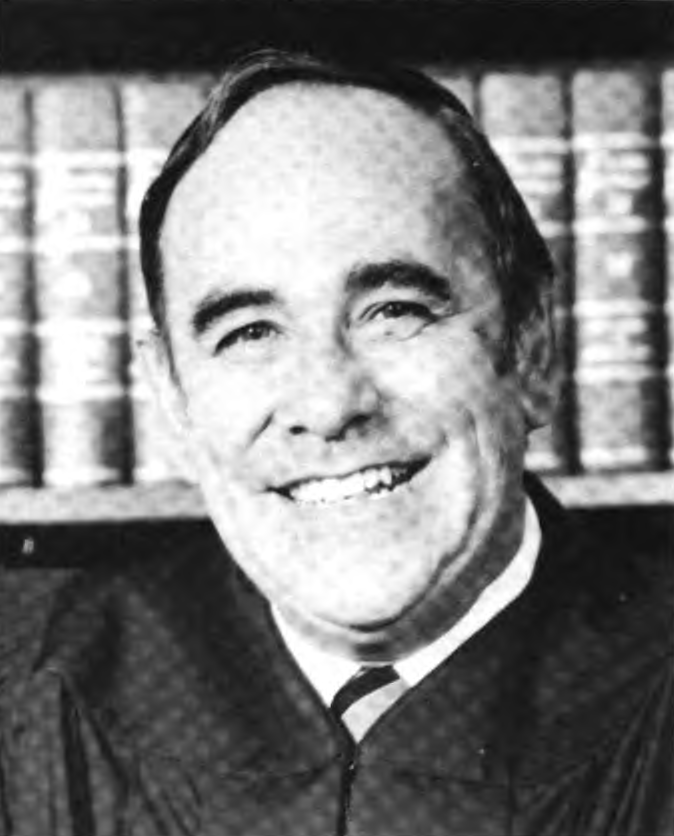

Senior Judge of the United States Court of Appeals for the Ninth Circuit
- In office November 21, 1992 – January 28, 2015

Judge of the United States Court of Appeals for the Ninth Circuit
- In office November 2, 1979 – November 21, 1992
- Appointed by: Jimmy Carter
- Preceded by: Seat established by 92 Stat. 1629
- Succeeded by: A. Wallace Tashima

Personal details
- Born: Arthur Lawrence Alarcón; August 14, 1925 Los Angeles, California, U.S.
- Died: January 28, 2015 (aged 89) Pacific Palisades, California, U.S.
- Education: University of Southern California (BA, LLB)

Arthur Lawrence Alarcón (August 14, 1925 – January 28, 2015) was a United States circuit judge of the United States Court of Appeals for the Ninth Circuit.

== Education and career ==
Born in Los Angeles, California, Alarcón was a staff sergeant in the United States Army from 1943 to 1946, then received a Bachelor of Arts degree from University of Southern California in 1949 and a Bachelor of Laws from USC Gould School of Law in 1951. He was a deputy district attorney in Los Angeles County, California from 1952 to 1961. He was a legal adviser and clemency and extraditions secretary to the governor of California from 1961 to 1962, and an executive assistant to the governor of California from 1962 to 1964. He briefly chaired the California parole board in 1964, and was then a judge of the Superior Court of California for the County of Los Angeles from 1964 to 1978. He was an associate justice of the California Court of Appeal Second Appellate District from 1978 to 1979.

== Federal judicial service ==
On August 28, 1979, Alarcón was nominated by President Jimmy Carter to a new seat on the United States Court of Appeals for the Ninth Circuit created by 92 Stat. 1629. He was confirmed by the United States Senate on October 31, 1979, and received his commission on November 2, 1979. He assumed senior status on November 21, 1992, and served until his death in Pacific Palisades, California, on January 28, 2015.

== Academic posts ==
Alarcón was an adjunct professor at the Southwestern University School of Law from 1985 to 2015, and was an adjunct professor at Loyola Marymount School of Law in 1993 and 1994.

== See also ==
- List of first minority male lawyers and judges in the United States
- List of Hispanic and Latino American jurists

Legal offices
Preceded by Seat established by 92 Stat. 1629	Judge of the United States Court of Appeals for the Ninth Circuit; 1979–1992	Succeeded by A. Wallace Tashima
