= Wen Hair Care =

American hair care brand

- Product type: Hair care
- Current owner: Chaz Dean
- Produced by: Guthy-Renker
- Country: United States of America

Wen Hair Care, stylized as WEN Hair Care, is an American hair care brand founded by Chaz Dean.

== History ==
Wen Hair Care was founded by celebrity hairstylist Chaz Dean. The company is most well known for producing cleansing conditioners marketed towards no-poo hair treatment methods, similar to the Curly Girl Method. Wen products are sold by Dean and Guthy-Renker. In January 2015, actress Brooke Shields became the official brand ambassador for Wen Hair Care.

== Controversy ==
Wen was at the center of a class-action lawsuit which alleged that the product had caused damage to hair after use.

In March 2016, the FDA opened an investigation into complaints about Wen Hair Care products by consumers. In October 2016, Wen agreed to settle out of court for a total of $26 million without admitting any wrongdoing.

The lawsuits and investigations prompted researchers to submit a letter to JAMA, calling for a higher level of regulations in the personal care industry, including allowing the FDA to recall personal care products.
