= Negative option billing =

Business practice

Negative option billing is a business practice in which customers are given goods or services that were not previously ordered, and must either continue to pay for the service or specifically decline it in advance of billing.

This is, for example, the model on which mail order services, such as Columbia House, and other book clubs are structured.

== US law ==
According to the Federal Trade Commission, unsolicited goods are considered a gift, and the recipient is not required to pay for or return them.

This is different from situations where a customer signs up for a service or club without reading fine print and agrees to purchase goods through the mail.

A notable example is the class-action lawsuit against Scholastic Corporation by consumers who felt "harassed, deceived, intimidated, and threatened" when they tried to cancel membership.

== Canadian law ==
In Canada, Parliament attempted to outlaw the practice in 1996 after a public outcry the previous year when most cable television companies added a package of new specialty services to their lineups in this manner without customers signing up for the package. This had previously been the standard manner of adding new channels to cable television service, but had not previously attracted the type of controversy that was raised by the 1995 channel launch, in part because the 1995 launch entailed a large number of channels which launched concurrently, whereas previous additions had only involved one or two channels at a time.

MP Roger Gallaway introduced a private-member's bill in 1996 to ban the practice which passed first reading, but died on the order paper when the House was dissolved for the 1997 elections. It was raised again in 1999, and was passed. Michael Janigan of the Public Interest Advocacy Centre stated:

The concern associated with the practice of negative option billing has its origins in the nature of a contract of purchase and sale, as recognized in common law. As every first year law student learns, such a contract consists of an offer and an acceptance. The history of consumer protection statutes is a chronicle of legislators attempting to ensure that the offer is conveyed without misrepresentation by the vendor to a purchaser who has an opportunity to make an informed choice to accept or refuse the offer. This is because a contract that is made with a consumer who is unaware of key elements of the contract such as price, quantity and quality of the goods to be delivered is subversive of the efficiency of the market as a whole.

The Ontario government also outlawed the practice in July 2005. Ontario's regulations prohibiting negative option billing do not protect consumers from owing for goods or services that they have agreed to receive. Additionally, Alberta has outlawed negative billing in 1998.

== UK law ==
In the UK the law which applies is The Consumer Protection (Distance Selling) Regulations 2000 (2000 No. 2334), specifically section 24 Inertia Selling. (This effectively replaces the repealed s.1 of the Unsolicited Goods and Services Act (1971, as amended).) In summary:

(2) The recipient [of unsolicited goods] may, as between himself and the sender, use, deal with or dispose of the goods as if they were an unconditional gift to him.

(3) The rights of the sender to the goods are extinguished.

== See also ==
- Easy-to-cancel mandate
- Automatic renewal clause
