= Continuity sales model =

A continuity program is a company’s sales offer where a buyer/consumer is agreeing to receive merchandise or services automatically at regular intervals (often monthly), without advance notice, until they cancel.

== Procedure ==
A consumer can join a plan simply by accepting an introductory offer of merchandise or services. Continuity plans may offer an introductory “free trial period” to let potential consumers check out the merchandise or service and decide whether to join the plan. If a consumer decides to keep the merchandise beyond the free trial period or fail to cancel the service within the free trial period, not only they must pay, but they automatically become a plan member.

Some continuity plans give customers an “approval” period. That way, customers can check out the merchandise and decide whether to keep it and pay for it. Many programs selling collectibles, like stamps or coins, work this way. Other continuity plans require people to pay for merchandise when they receive it.

Joining a continuity plan means the consumer agrees to the plan’s sales method as long as they are members. They’ll automatically get periodic shipments of merchandise or delivery of services. Consumers won’t get any announcements or rejection forms before each shipment or service period. The shipments or services continue until consumers cancel their membership.

== Terms and conditions ==
Sellers must give customers information about the plan’s terms and conditions, clearly and conspicuously, in their promotional materials. These terms may include:

- that you become a member if you accept the introductory merchandise or initial round of services — unless you cancel;
- that periodic delivery of merchandise or services will occur — with no further action on your part;
- a description of the merchandise or services you agree to buy;
- whether there’s a minimum purchase;
- how often you’ll receive the products or services;
- an explanation of the plan’s billing procedure for each shipment or period of service.
- how much time you have to review “on approval” merchandise before you have to pay;
- the terms of the plan’s refund or return policy;
- how and when consumers can cancel their membership;
- the price of the goods or services if a consumer fails to cancel, including shipping and handling, if applicable.

Usually a plan will use the same billing method for future shipments that it used for the introductory merchandise or service period.

== Message to consumers ==
The Federal Trade Commission (FTC) advises that before consumers agree to any plan:

- Read the terms and conditions of the plan carefully so you understand the obligations of membership before you join.
- Keep copies of plan documentation that explain the terms and conditions of the plan. Some plans may send you this information with the introductory shipment.
- If an offer is made over the phone, listen carefully and, if you don’t understand the terms, ask the seller to repeat them. Write down important information, such as the customer service telephone number or address. Don’t give in to high-pressure sales tactics; if you don’t want the offer, feel comfortable hanging up.
- Check out the seller. Contact your local consumer protection agency or the Better Business Bureau to find out if they have any complaints on file. A record of complaints may indicate questionable practices, but a lack of complaints doesn’t necessarily mean that the seller doesn’t have problems. Unscrupulous businesses or business people often change names and locations to hide complaint histories.
