= Dean Pregerson =

American judge (born 1951)

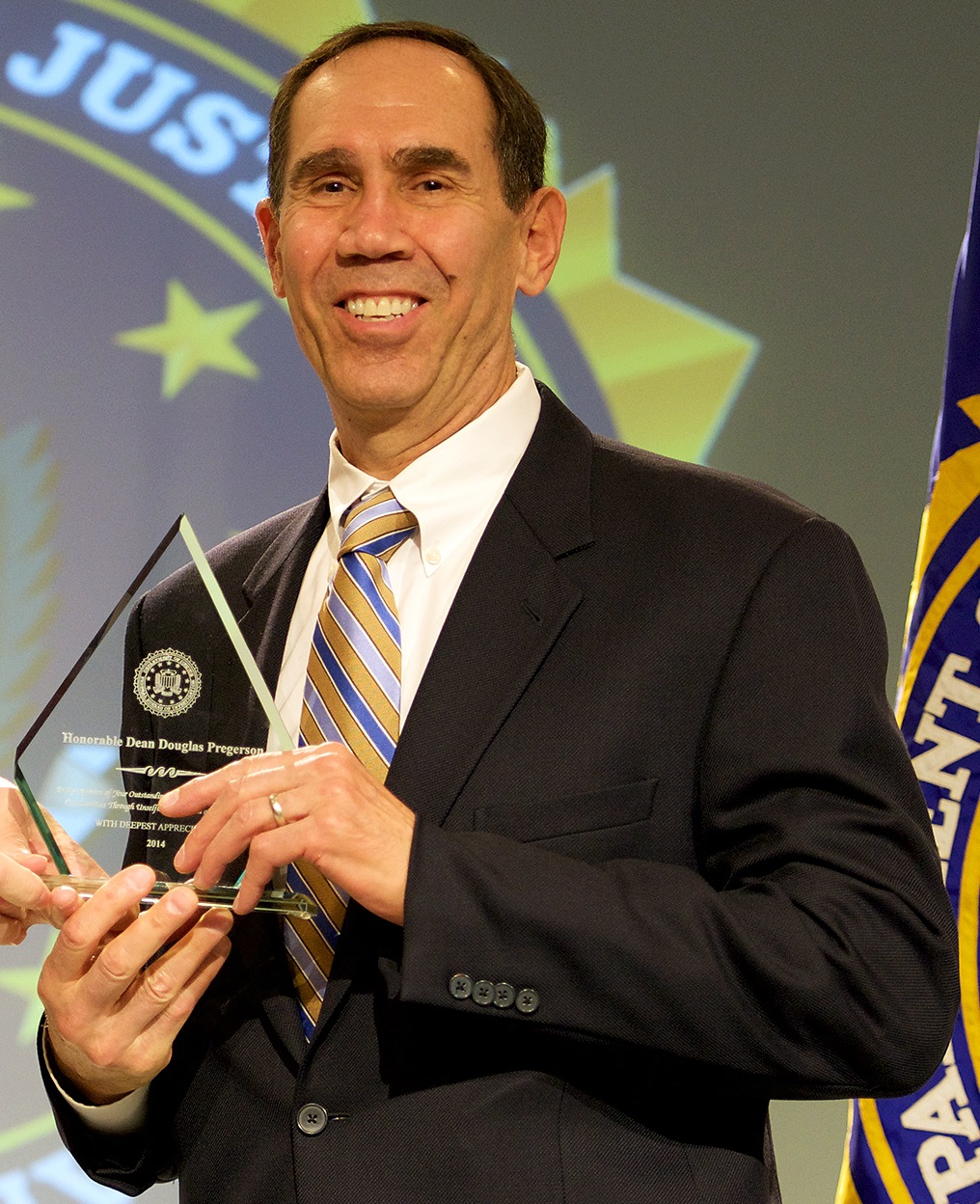

Senior Judge of the United States District Court for the Central District of California
- In office January 28, 2016 – June 1, 2025

Judge of the United States District Court for the Central District of California
- In office August 1, 1996 – January 28, 2016
- Appointed by: Bill Clinton
- Preceded by: A. Wallace Tashima
- Succeeded by: John W. Holcomb

Personal details
- Born: Dean Douglas Pregerson; January 28, 1951 (age 75) Los Angeles, California, U.S.
- Spouse: Sharon D. Skomer
- Children: 2 (1 deceased)
- Parent: Harry Pregerson (father)
- Relatives: Katie Rodan (sister)
- Education: University of California, Los Angeles (BA); UC Davis School of Law (JD)

Dean Douglas Pregerson (born January 28, 1951) is a former United States district judge of the United States District Court for the Central District of California.

== Education and career ==
Pregerson was born to a Jewish American family in Los Angeles. His father, Harry Pregerson, was a federal judge on the United States Court of Appeals for the Ninth Circuit. He has a sister Katie Rodan. He received a Bachelor of Arts degree from the University of California, Los Angeles in 1972 and a Juris Doctor from the UC Davis School of Law in 1976. Pregerson began his career as a Parole Hearing Officer with the California Department of Corrections in 1977. In 1978, Pregerson became an Assistant Public Defender in Agana, Guam. Although some public defender services were available in Guam beginning in 1968, Pregerson joined the first class of public defenders in the modern Guam Public Defender Service Corporation. He served in that role for three years before entering private practice in Ventura, California in 1978. Pregerson remained in private practice, specializing in civil litigation, from 1981 until his appointment to the federal judiciary in 1996. During that time, Pregerson served in numerous roles, including as the Vice-President and General Counsel of the Torrance Company. At the time of his appointment, Pregerson was a partner in the firm of Pregerson, Richman & Luna.

=== Federal judicial service ===
On January 26, 1996, Pregerson was nominated by President Bill Clinton to a seat on the United States District Court for the Central District of California vacated by A. Wallace Tashima. Pregerson was confirmed by the United States Senate on July 24, 1996, and received his commission on August 1, 1996. He assumed senior status on January 28, 2016. He retired from judicial service on June 1, 2025.

=== Notable cases ===
Pregerson has been involved in many cases related to the entertainment industry, the use of concealed stun belts on prisoners in court, as well as the planned completion of the I-710 Freeway.

== Personal life ==
In December 2013, Pregerson's son, David, age 23, was killed by a hit and run driver while walking home in the Pacific Palisades community of Los Angeles.

== See also ==
- List of Jewish American jurists

Legal offices
Preceded by A. Wallace Tashima	Judge of the United States District Court for the Central District of California; 1996–2016	Succeeded by John W. Holcomb
