= Vubiquity =

American content technology company

Vubiquity, Inc.
- Type: Subsidiary
- Industry: Entertainment; Creative Industries
- Founded: 1988
- Defunct: October 8, 2026; 7 days ago
- Fate: acquired by Premiere Digital
- Successor: Premiere Digital
- Headquarters: Burbank, California, United States
- Area served: Worldwide
- Key people: Raman Abrol, GM and Chief Commercial Officer
- Products: Video On Demand; Localization; Digital Processing; Creative Services; Post-Production; Broadcast Programming; OTT Platforms; Content Aggregation and Archiving; Live and Linear Transport; Live PPV and Event Distribution; Metadata Management; C3 and Next Day Air Processing and Distribution
- Parent: Premiere Digital
- Website: Vubiquity.com

Vubiquity, Inc. was a Burbank, California-based provider of content monetization, distribution and processing technology used by entertainment and media companies. The company ensures its client's video content is properly formatted, licensed and tracked when shown on different media outlets, such as streaming services.

In October 2026, it was acquired by US-based digital media distribution and software company, Premiere Digital Services.

== History ==
Avail-TVN logo

=== Launch as TVN Entertainment Corporation ===
The company was founded in 1988 as Touchtone Video Network, Inc. (later renamed TVN Entertainment Corporation), a distributor of pay-per-view movies via C-band satellite aimed primarily at rural households. The pay-per-view movies were offered via 10 channels, which TVN branded as "theaters," akin to a movie theater. Investors in TVN Entertainment's launch included Paramount Pictures and MCA, Inc., which provided titles for TVN to distribute via its pay-per-view channels.

At the time of its launch in January 1991, customers paid a one-time fee of $19.99 to "hook in" to TVN's programming via a special adapter that plugged in to a conventional C-band satellite receiver. Movies were offered to customers for $3.99 each.

In 1994, TVN signed a deal with the National Football League to offer some regular season games on eight of its 10 pay-per-view channels each Sunday. At the time, the games were produced by NBC and Fox on a regional basis for local broadcast affiliates; the NFL's deal with TVN was one of the earliest coast-to-coast distribution deals via satellite and was a precursor to DirecTV's NFL Sunday Ticket.

In the late 1990s, TVN saw a decline in its consumer pay-per-view products as upstarts Dish Network, PrimeStar and DirecTV began offering DBS television service.

=== Transformation into VOD ===
In early 2000, TV executive Jim Riley was brought in to reshape the business and with colleague Doug Sylvester began restructuring over $140MM in debt, while simultaneously transforming the business into the first national on-demand service. Quickly surpassing early VOD entrants including Sony's Intertainer and In Demand, TVN supplied both the tech stack as well as a suite of content to enable the launch of VOD into local servers within the head ends of Cable TV operators across North America. Using forward path satellite delivery and return path via high speed connections, TVN was the first company to create a multicast solution allowing a single (movie, show) video file to be packaged (along with metadata, artwork and trailer) and transmitted in full CONUS to servers around the country, ushering in a new era of on demand services for Americans. Striking deals with every major Hollywood Studio, Pay TV Network and most Major Sports leagues, TVN caught the attention of Comcast's Steve Burke who in 2005 hired the firm to create the first "free on demand" solution with the major Cable TV networks, enabling live-to-VOD and catch up television, quickly growing to thousands of hours monthly of the best in TV content on demand. Within a few years, TVN turned a failing business into the largest VOD licensing and service provider in the TV industry. TVN's many on demand firsts included, a national network of destination feeders attached to VOD servers, TCP/IP asset package processing, Digital Ad insertion (DAI) with FFD, UFC and WWE on demand, VOD Olympics coverage, and more. When sold to Avail Media in 2009, the business transformed its balance sheet from $140MM in debt to $26MM EBITDA, initiated the start of nationalized VOD and made "Metadata" cool.

=== Merger with Avail Media and subsequent re-brand to Vubiquity ===
In 2009, Avail Media (an IPTV provider) and TVN merged to create Avail-TVN. In May 2010, the company announced that it would add support for 3D television to its roster of services. The company’s 3D on-demand offering works with operators' existing infrastructure and will work with existing set-top boxes after minor software updates.

In September 2010, Avail-TVN was listed as part of the Inc. 500/5000. The company ranked number 1833 overall, and number 24 among media companies. In November 2012, Avail-TVN placed 6th on Deloitte’s Technology Fast 500 and earned the top spot among media and entertainment companies. The company earned its place in the top 10 with 38,479 percent growth from 2007 to 2011.

In May 2012, Avail-TVN announced that it had raised $100 million of financing, led by the Carlyle Group, to fund global expansion and domestic service development, and had acquired UK-based On Demand Group, which continued to operate under its own name.

In March 2013, Avail-TVN and On Demand Group re-branded as a single entity, Vubiquity.

In January 2018, Chesterfield, Missouri-based business software provider Amdocs announced it was acquiring Vubiquity, for $224 million.

In October 2026, it was acquired by US-based digital media distribution and software company, Premiere Digital Services for an undisclosed amount.
