= Guthy-Renker =

American direct-marketing company

- Type: Private
- Industry: Direct marketing
- Founded: November 1988; 37 years ago
- Headquarters: El Segundo, California
- Area served: Worldwide
- Key people: Bill Guthy and Greg Renker, founding principals and co-chairmen
- Products: Reclaim by Victoria Principal; Meaningful Beauty by Cindy Crawford developed with Jean-Louis Sebagh; J. LO Beauty by Jennifer Lopez; Crepe Erase; Westmore Beauty
- Revenue: $1.8 billion (2012)
- Website: guthy-renker.com

Guthy-Renker (/ˈɡʌθi ˈrɛŋkər/ GUTH-ee RENG-kər) is a California-based direct-response marketing company that sells health and beauty products directly to consumers through infomercials, television ads, direct mail, telemarketing, e-mail marketing, and the Internet. Many of its products are endorsed by celebrities, including actresses and musicians.

The company started marketing self-help products endorsed by Fran Tarkenton and motivational speaker Tony Robbins, previous products also included exercise equipment such as a pilates program, called the "Malibu Pilates system", endorsed by actress Susan Lucci and Instant Abs by model Heidi Klum.

Guthy-Renker was founded in November 1988 by Bill Guthy and Greg Renker. In 1995, it began distributing the acne treatment program Proactiv, which became responsible for more than half its revenues by 2005.

The company also created seven subsidiaries in the late 1990s for different products and advertising channels.

In 1996, it founded infomercial channel, GRTV, which was sold to TVN Entertainment Corporation in 1999.

Guthy-Renker's revenues grew from $400 million in 2001 to $1.5 billion by 2009. It formed a joint venture with Nestlé Skin Health in 2016.

== History ==
Guthy-Renker was founded in November 1988 by Bill Guthy and Greg Renker. They met at the Indian Wells Racquet Club and Resort in Indian Wells, California. They considered starting an infomercial company after an order was placed at Guthy's cassette duplication company, Cassette Productions Unlimited, for 50,000 copies of a real estate lecture to be sold through infomercials.

At the time many infomercials mimicked talk shows and investigative news specials, raising concerns among consumers and policy makers that the programs were misleading. To avoid the controversial practice, Guthy-Renker disclosed that their infomercials were paid advertisements at the beginning of each program. It made professional-quality productions. Renker was invited to testify to a Congressional subcommittee in 1990 regarding ethics in advertising, which led Guthy-Renker and others to form the National Infomercial Marketing Association to create industry standards.

The following year, the firm had to cut back operations, because news coverage of the Persian Gulf War drew viewers away from infomercials. Ronald Perelman of Forbes Holdings Inc. bought a 37.5 percent share of Guthy-Renker in 1993 in exchange for $25 million and priority access to air-time on Perelman's television stations. At the time, Guthy-Renker had grown to $60 million in revenue. In 1996, Perelman's stake in the company was resold to News Corp and Guthy-Renker bought it back. In 1998, a Japanese trading company, Nissho Iwai Group, bought a 17 percent portion of Guthy-Renker's Asia subsidiary for $9 million. Guthy-Renker created a television station for infomercials called GRTV in 1996, which was sold to TVN Entertainment Corporation in 1999.

From 1995–1997, the firm created seven new subsidiaries. These included Guthy-Renker Radio, Internet, Select Network, International and Fitness, as well as subsidiaries like an online dating service and a psychic business that did not perform well. Guthy-Renker partnered with National Media Corp. to help market some of its fitness products, which led to a legal dispute that was settled with undisclosed terms in 1997. Guthy-Renker claimed National Media Corp. excessively aired infomercials for an exercise machine, the Fitness Flyer, and started selling an unauthorized imitation of the original. National claimed Guthy-Renker had not provided enough Fitness Flyers to meet demand.

In May 1999, Guthy-Renker formed a strategic partnership with search advertising company LookSmart, who acquired some assets of Guthy-Renker's e-commerce division for $3 million.

Guthy-Renker grew to $400 million in revenue by 2001 and $1.5 billion by 2009. In 2008, Goldman Sachs bought a stake in the company that valued Guthy-Renker at $3 billion. In 2011, Guthy-Renker acquired a portion of Paramount Equity Mortgage, a solar energy, insurance and mortgage loans company. In 2015, the firm moved from its longtime headquarters in Palm Desert to El Segundo, California.

== Products ==
=== Motivational Products ===
Guthy-Renker's first products were self-help and motivational courses. The founders bought the rights to a self-help book they were both fans of, Think and Grow Rich, for $100,000 and aired their first infomercial selling the book in 1988. The infomercials were hosted by former football quarterback Fran Tarkenton and grossed $10 million in sales. Another early product marketed by Guthy-Renker was Tony Robbins's "Personal Power" series of motivational lectures.

=== Beauty and fitness products ===
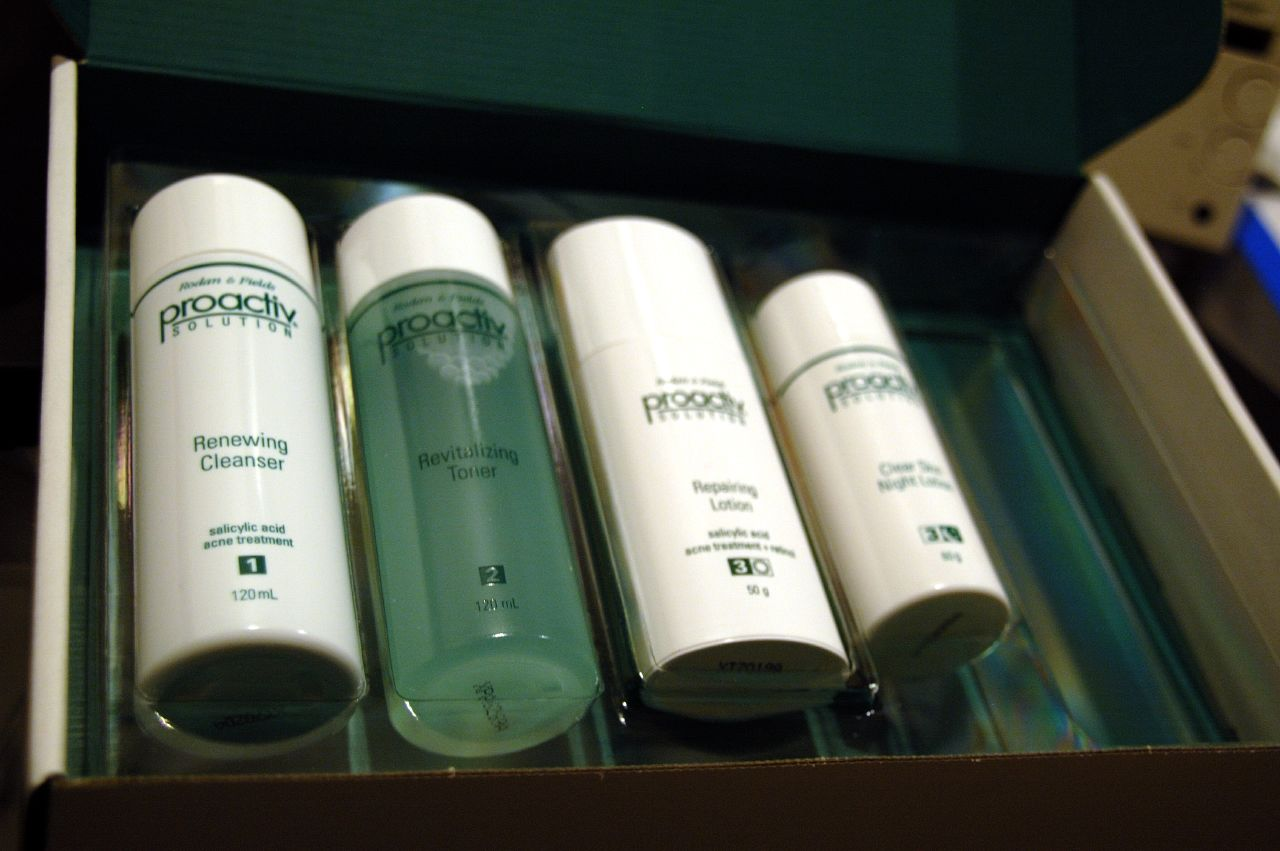
A Proactiv acne treatment package

The company started to sell cosmetics and skin-care products in 1991, starting with the "Principal Secret" cosmetics line endorsed by actress Victoria Principal, after market research showed that 70 percent of Guthy-Renker's audience were women. In the 1990s, the company started marketing housewares, the "Perfect Smile" teeth whitening product and fitness products like the "Fitness Flyer", "Perfect Abs" and "Perfect Buns and Thighs". By 1996, 40 percent of the company's revenues were from fitness products.

Guthy-Renker uses infomercials, television ads, direct mail, telemarketing and the internet to sell products directly to the consumer. The firm's infomercials have production costs exceeding $1 million and usually feature celebrity endorsers. In 2010, Guthy-Renker sold 15 different products. Approximately half of Guthy-Renker's revenues in 2005 came from the Proactiv acne treatment, and 30 percent of its revenues were from international sources.

Guthy-Renker markets the "Meaningful Beauty" anti-aging skin care system endorsed by model/actress Cindy Crawford and developed by Algerian-French cosmetic surgeon and chemist Jean-Louis Sebagh. The "Sheer Cover" brand of mineral makeup is endorsed by talk show host Leeza Gibbons. The company also manages the "In an Instant" line of skin care products endorsed by model Heidi Klum and the "Malibu Pilates" exercise equipment endorsed by actress Susan Lucci. Guthy-Renker’s Proactiv line is endorsed by celebrities, including Jessica Simpson and Kelly Clarkson. The brand reports annual revenue of $1 billion.

=== WEN haircare ===
In January 2015, it was announced that actress Brooke Shields would endorse Wen Hair Care developed by Chaz Dean.

== European Business ==
Guthy-Renker made its first foray into Europe in 1997, establishing a London office for Guthy-Renker International. An office was opened in Weisbaden, Germany to service Germany, Austria and Switzerland. The company made a strategic purchase of TV Shop from Sweden-based Modern Times Group (MTG) in 2007 to enable Guthy-Renker to better penetrate the Scandinavian and German markets, and an office was opened in Malmo, Sweden to service the Scandinavian market.

In 2014, Guthy-Renker AB closed its Sweden and German offices and consolidated its European business in London once again.

In 2016, a joint-venture was entered into with Nestlé Skin Health, which acquired a majority stake in Guthy-Renker's European business. The company was renamed The Proactiv Company and all other product lines were discontinued. Nestlé then incorporated Proactiv into its acquisition of Galderma from L'Oreal. In 2019, Nestlé exited the skin health business and sold Galderma and Proactiv to a private equity consortium. Proactiv global assets were sold to Taro Pharmaceuticals in 2022 and renamed Alchemee.
