= Greg Renker =

American businessman (b.1957)

- Born: Gregory Renker; 1957 (age 68–69); Phoenix, Arizona, US
- Occupation: Co-Chairman of Guthy-Renker
- Known for: Cofounding Guthy-Renker (with Bill Guthy)

Gregory Renker (born 1957), is best known for cofounding Guthy-Renker with partner Bill Guthy. He was born in Phoenix, Arizona in 1957 and had eight siblings. Growing up, Renker's family moved a lot due to his father's work managing country clubs and hotels. Renker worked his way through college at San Diego State University and married Stacey Renker several years later.

Renker credited the Eisenhower hospital for saving his life with an emergency heart bypass surgery and for saving his wife's life from a flu condition. After he recovered, the couple led a donation drive, which led to the creation of The Renker Wellness Center and a 24-room hospital facility called The Greg & Stacey Renker Pavilion.

Renker met future business partner Bill Guthy at one of the country clubs managed by his father. The two both enjoyed self-help books and founded Guthy-Renker together to market self-help products in 1988. The company grew into one of the largest direct-response companies on the market and expanded into beauty and fitness products among others. Renker co-founded the National Infomercial Marketing Association (now known as the Electronic Retailing Association) and was awarded the Horatio Alger award, which honors individuals who overcome adversity to achieve success.

== Early life ==
Greg Renker was born in Phoenix, Arizona, in 1957. He had eight siblings. Renker's family moved every year due to his father's work managing a chain of country clubs and hotels. Desert Magazine described his lifestyle growing up as humble, but posh. The family was not wealthy, but due to his father's work, they spent a lot of time in high-end resorts socializing with "the rich and famous."

Renker became interested in self-help books at age 16, after his father lost his job. In his teenage years, Renker had subscriptions to six newspapers and read 200-300 magazines per month. He felt that learning how to sell may help him avoid the financial stress his family experienced. Renker attended San Diego State University with a major in comparative literature. While attending college, Renker worked several sales jobs, including one as a real estate agent.

== Family and community ==
Greg Renker met his future wife, Stacey, in high school. Ten years after graduation, mutual friends arranged for the two to meet. They were married two years later and had three children.

Renker credits the Eisenhower hospital for saving his wife's life after she went into toxic shock from a flu condition and for saving his own after he received an emergency heart bypass surgery at age 41. According to The Desert Sun, "Renker nearly died from cardiovascular disease." This came as a surprise, since Renker was healthy and athletic. After recovering, Renker and his wife made donations to the hospital and led a donation drive, which led to the creation of The Renker Wellness Center and The Greg & Stacey Renker Pavilion, a 24-room hospital facility. For his philanthropy, Renker was given an Individual Achievement award by the American Heart Association.

Renker serves as chairman of the Eisenhower Medical Center and as chairman emeritus for the Annenberg Center for Health Sciences. Renker and his wife have also been presenting sponsors of the Rick Weiss Humanitarian Awards since the award's creation.

== Career ==
Greg Renker is best known for cofounding Guthy-Renker, a direct-marketing company. He met future business partner and cofounder of Guthy Renker, Bill Guthy, at the Indian Wells Racquet Club and Resort. Guthy's family had leased a vacation home at the resort that Renker's father was managing. Bill Guthy and Greg Renker were both readers of self-help books and fans of the book "Think and Grow Rich." They bought the rights to the book for $100,000 and ran their first infomercial in 1988, which grossed $10 million. That November, they formed Guthy-Renker, which eventually grew into one of the largest direct-response companies, selling beauty, health, self-help products, and other services. In 1990, Renker testified before a Congressional subcommittee after the Federal Trade Commission was suggesting new regulations for the infomercial industry.

Afterwards, he co-founded the National Infomercial Marketing Association (now known as the Electronic Retailing Association), an organization intended to self-regulate the infomercial industry against deceptive practices, such as publishing advertisements under the guise of "news specials." Renker also testified in front of the Congressional Subcommittee on Consumer Protection, Product Safety and Insurance in 2009 at a hearing focused on the use of testimonials from customers that experienced extraordinary results that are not typical among general users. In 2011, Renker was awarded the Legends in Advertising Award by the American Advertising Federation for his work "elevating infomercials from their humble beginnings in the 1990s to the status of a multi-billion dollar industry today." The following year, he was recognized with the Horatio Alger award. According to the Horatio Alger Association, the award "honors the achievements of outstanding individuals in society who have succeeded in spite of adversity."
