= Automatic renewal clause =

Automated renewal of a contract unless terminated

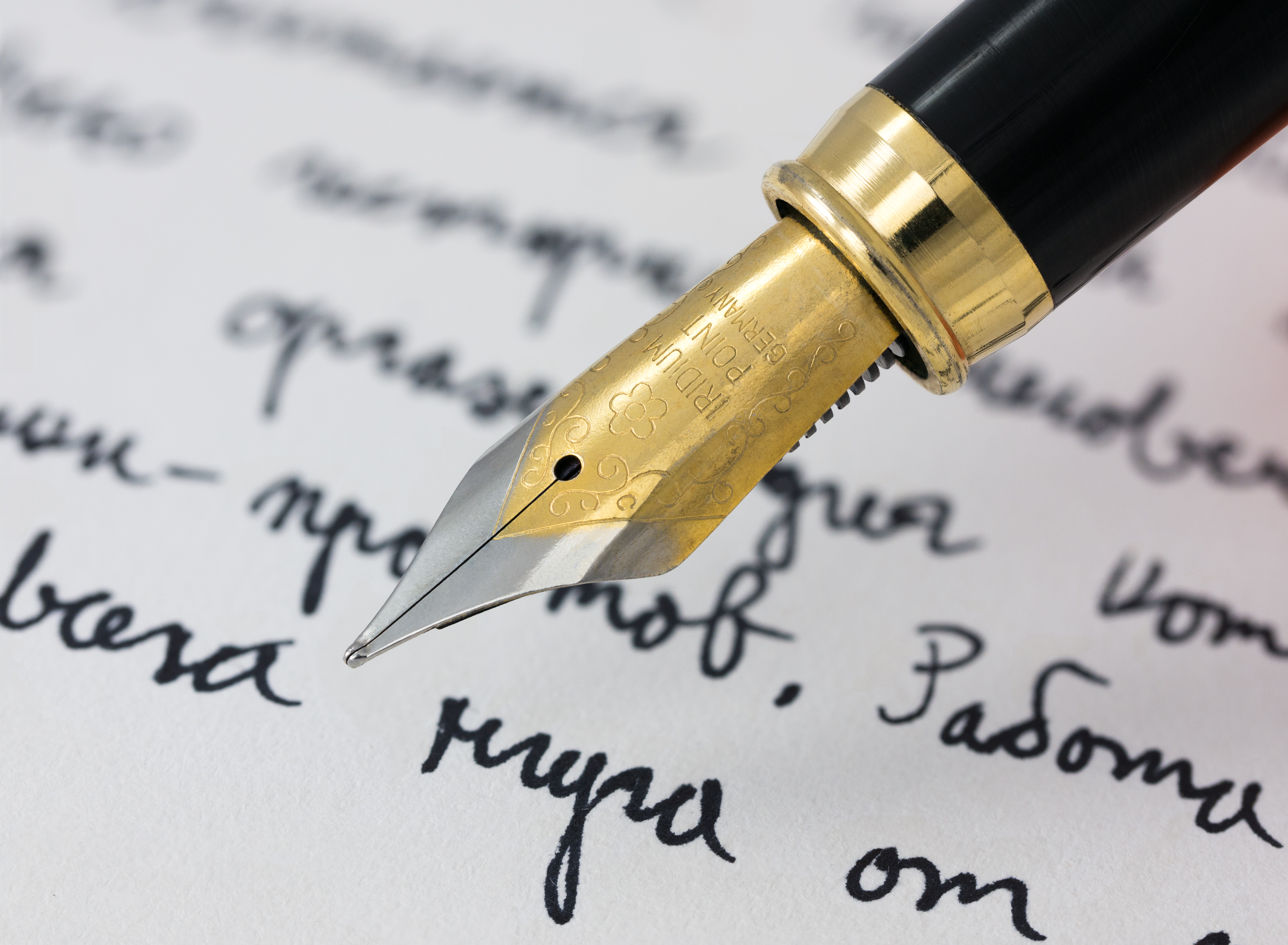
An automatic renewal clause is used in the insurance and healthcare industries

In contracting, an automatic renewal clause (also referred to as an evergreen clause), is activated towards the end of the contractual period whereby it automatically renews the terms of an agreement except when the contract is terminated (through mutual agreement or contract breach), or one of the contracting parties has sent a letter of contract cessation to others prior to the end of the period. An example of the clause is illustrated in the following quote: “Each Term shall automatically renew for subsequent periods of the same length as the initial Term unless either party gives the other written notice of termination at least thirty (30) days prior to expiration of the then-current Term."

Firms that are involved in contracting for multiple years generally use this clause more often when compared to other firms. Also, firms engage in this legal process to gain economic benefits and reduce their costs. Examples of industries in which it is generally used include insurance, digital media, healthcare, telecommunications, fitness, mining and so forth.

Legal complications of the clause inculcate the advance notice time period, extent of contract transparency and grounds for contract termination. The clause may be unfairly used by businesses for increased revenues and profitability. Thus the regulation of these clauses is imperative, however, the process of implementing it and the penalties of its misuse vary across different countries and at times, states as well. Countries such as the United States, United Kingdom and Australia have enacted laws governing this clause.

== Economic rationale ==
The Neo-classical model of Economics embedded in the “rationality axiom” assumes economic agents to be rational decision makers. According to the theory, these economic agents leverage the costs and benefits of given options and then choose the option which maximizes their net utility or profitability.

In line with the above theory, economic agents would consider the costs of contract renewal, (re)negotiation and termination prior to the decision making-process . Any changes in the terms of agreement of a contract might result in "transaction costs" which may or may not be greater than that of renewal of the same terms of agreement. Nonetheless, costs are incurred in both the situations. However, contracts cease to apply towards the end of the contracting period thus no costs are borne in the case of contract termination.

The automatic renewal clause becomes an economically viable option in the case of contract renewals. In the case of firms contracting for single periods, contract termination is the optimal decision and the one that the rational consumer is likely to make as the contract would itself cease to exist without any costs. However, firms that intend to contract for multiple periods with each other and given that the terms of agreement would apply in each period, might find that they have to incur costs to renew the contract each time it has been terminated. Thus, in this situation firms might find that the automatic renewal clause is the better solution as no costs have to be incurred for contract renewals in each period except only once to terminate the clause.

Another economically significant aspect of the clause is its impact on the firm’s profitability. Contract termination may negatively impact a firm’s earnings which the management may cater to by increasing the costs of contract termination for consumers. In line with the traditional economic theory, a rational economic actor would opt for the economically superior alternative which in this case would be contract renewal.

== Enforceability in legal systems ==
The enforceability of the automatic renewal clause varies between countries.

=== United States ===
The legislation of the United States encompasses a federal and a state jurisdiction. States' jurisdictions vary in terms of the regulation of the clause. Some states, including Florida, New York, Michigan, California and Illinois, have enacted statutes governing the evergreen clause while others such as Louisiana do not have any such statutes.

California is a heavily populated and economically significant state. It hosts a number of e-commerce, software development and digital media services' companies. In line with the California Business & Professional Code 17600-06 statute, the clause is enforceable in subscription services' contracts. It details that contracts should be "clear and conspicuous", which entails "larger in size or contrasting in type, font, or color than surrounding text and in close proximity to the signature".

The Automatic Contract Renewal Act (815 ILCS 601/1) of Illinois emphasizes on contract transparency,"where such contract automatically renews unless the consumer cancels the contract, shall disclose the automatic renewal clause clearly and conspicuously in the contract, including the cancellation procedure", and communication of contract renewal to customers,"Written notice shall be provided to the consumer no less than 30 days and more than 60 days before the cancellation deadline pursuant to the automatic renewal clause", as legally customary for organizations employing this clause in their contracts. The applicability of the act does not extend to "business-to-business contracts" or "banks, trust companies, savings and loan associations, savings banks, or credit unions licensed or organized under the laws of any state or the United States, or any foreign bank maintaining a branch or agency licensed or organized under the laws of any state of the United States, or any subsidiary or affiliate thereof."

=== United Kingdom ===
The clause is regulated under the Consumer Rights Act 2015 in the United Kingdom which "aims to protect consumers against unfair contract terms and notices". Just as in the case of the Automatic Contract Renewal Act (815 ILCS 601/1) of Illinois, this act also emphasizes on contract transparency with regards to contract duration and cancellation, "Your customer needs to know how long their contract is due to run and how to cancel it (if they don’t want it renewed)". It highlights that "fair terms" should be employed in the contract to prevent consumers from harm. Examples of the unfair terms, listed below, have also been described in the act.

- "This will be a rolling contract that will automatically renew unless you contact us 24 hours prior to renewal in order to cancel`."
- "After expiry of the initial term, 3 months' notice of cancellation is required"

The above two examples link to the provision of insufficient information to the consumer and inclusion of "Over-lengthy notice periods" in contracts.

== Commercial uses ==
Commercial contracts in the leasing, digital media, insurance, telecommunications and fitness industries often inculcate the evergreen clause in their terms of agreement.

=== Lease contracts ===
The clause is employed in Business to consumer, business-to-business and business-to-government lease contracts.

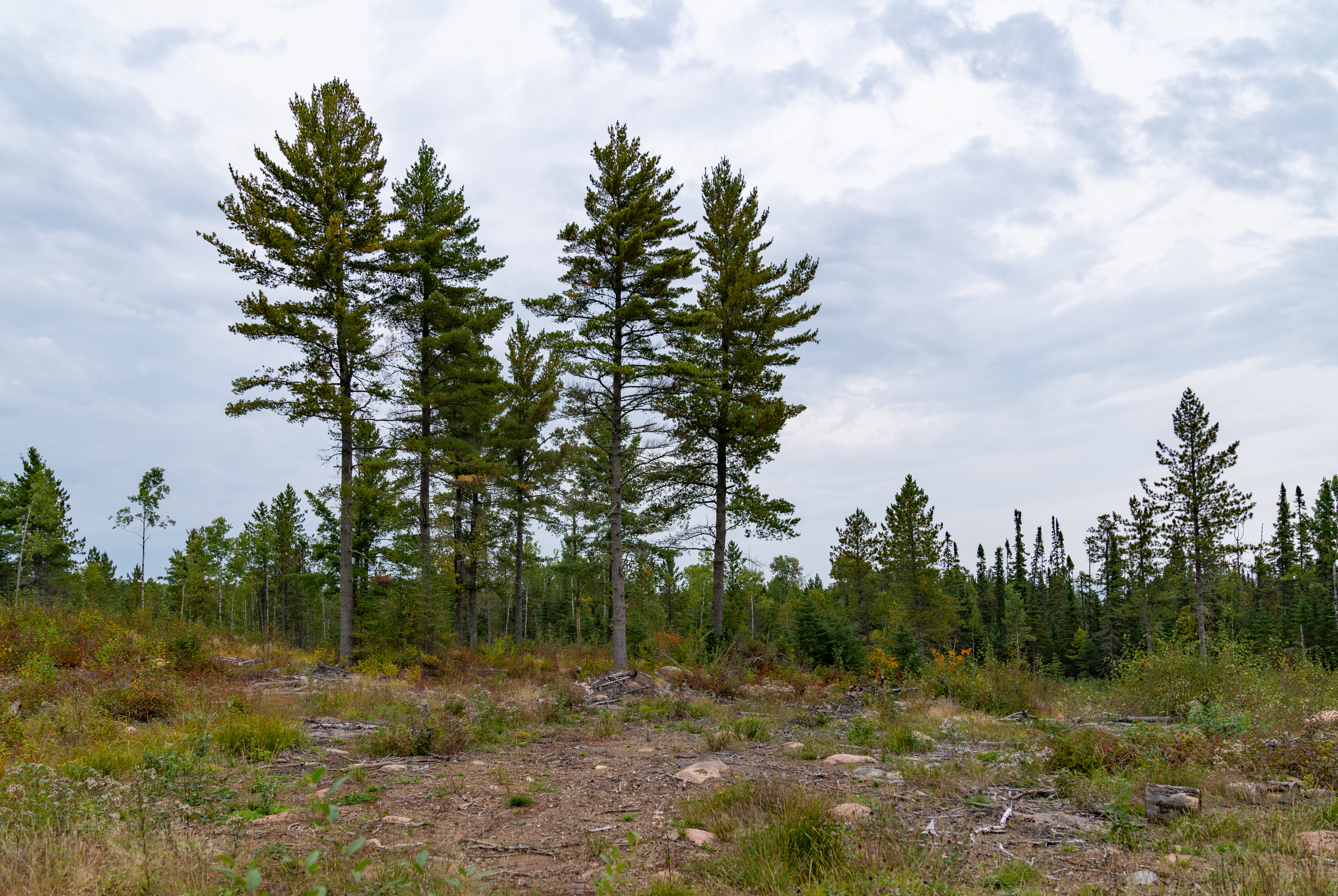
Twin Metals has an auto-renewal mineral lease for the Superior National Forest of Minnesota

Twin Metals, a U.S based mining conglomerate, has signed multiple, auto-renewal mineral leases with the Federal Government of United States. One of which allows the conglomerate to mine in the Superior National Forest of Minnesota for copper and other metals. During 2016, the United States Department of Agriculture noted concerns regarding the environmental damage in the Superior National Forest as a result of mining. This led to a point where an appeal was put forth for the prohibition of mining practices in the "234,000 acres" of Superior National Forest land for "20 years". However, the presence of the clause permitted Twin Metals to legally retaliate against the decision.

Radio Rentals, a U.K. based consumer goods and services company specializing in appliance retail and rental, adopted a 2-3-4 years rental policy whereby consumers who were unable to afford an item rented it for a period of 2, 3 or 4 years. The commercial contract was inclusive of evergreen clause and detailed that the rented item must be purchased towards the end of the rental period to prevent the contract from renewing automatically for another rental term.

=== Digital media ===
A number of digital media companies have been reported to adopt a unique marketing approach. In line with it, consumers are allowed to use the services offered for a limited period of time without any costs. Towards the end of this period, unless cancelled by the consumer, they are automatically subscribed to the service.

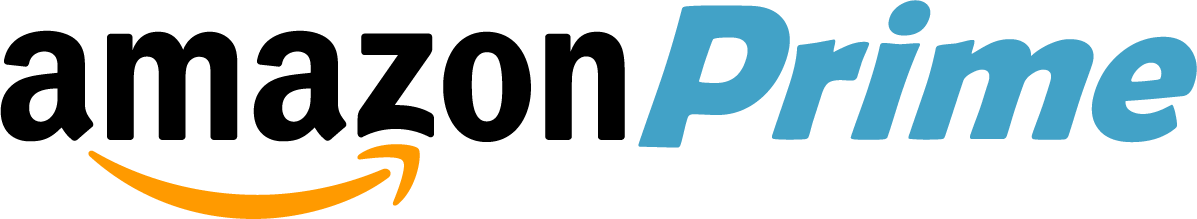
Amazon Prime is an auto-renewing subscription service

Amazon.com, an American e-commerce multinational corporation, offers a multitude of online services such as Amazon Prime, Amazon Web services, Alexa and so forth to its consumers. Amazon Prime is a paid subscription service which provides consumers with exclusive content and services and these subscriptions renew automatically towards the end of the period. A similar business model has been adopted by online audio services' companies such as SoundCloud and Apple Music.

=== Insurance policies ===
In terms of insurance policies, the clause is widely used by companies such as UnitedHealth Group (USA), Allianz (Germany), Nippon Life (Japan), Life Insurance Corporation of India, Zurich Insurance Group (Switzerland), MLC Limited (Australia) and so forth. Given the types and coverage of insurance policies, certain insurance contracts such as property and medical have been noted more by media agents -such as newspapers- than others to inculcate this clause. The notice transmission and active cancellation periods of auto-renewals for these policies vary by country and region. In some cases, insurance companies may also increase the monthly payments for certain types of insurance policies in successive renewal periods.

=== Business-to-business contracts ===
Automatic renewal clauses are common in contracts between businesses, including subscriptions to software as a service (SaaS), equipment maintenance agreements and business service contracts. Most automatic renewal laws in the United States are consumer-protection statutes that do not apply to such contracts, and some states, such as Illinois, expressly exclude them; a few, including New York and Wisconsin, also regulate renewals in business contracts.

Maintenance contracts for lifts (elevators) often run for several years and renew automatically, and courts in several countries have limited their enforcement. In France, the Construction and Housing Code requires lift maintenance contracts to last at least one year and to state how they are renewed or terminated, and allows the owner to terminate on three months' notice when major works are carried out by a different company.

Automatic renewal provisions are also found in SaaS agreements. A 2026 analysis of the published customer terms of 50 SaaS vendors found that 44 contained explicit or implied automatic renewal provisions. Of the 22 vendors specifying a fixed non-renewal notice period, 20 required 30 days' notice. Three vendors included contractual caps on renewal price increases.

Long terms and automatic renewal are also common in contracts for business services such as uniform rental. According to antitrust writer Matt Stoller, uniform rental contracts in the United States usually run for five years and renew automatically unless the customer gives written notice 90 to 180 days before the end of the term.

=== Miscellaneous ===
Mobile phone services in the telecommunications industry and gym memberships in the fitness industry are also auto-renewed.

In 2019, Mobile telecommunications network (MTN) company launched a subscription based mobile phone service in South Africa. The service was a 1MB mobile data plan that renewed automatically charging consumers "40c per megabyte every time they ran out of data" . Following this, it was highlighted that this was simply another form of an Out-of-Bundle Data Usage plan. As a result of the consumer backlash, the company was forced to withdraw its data plan.

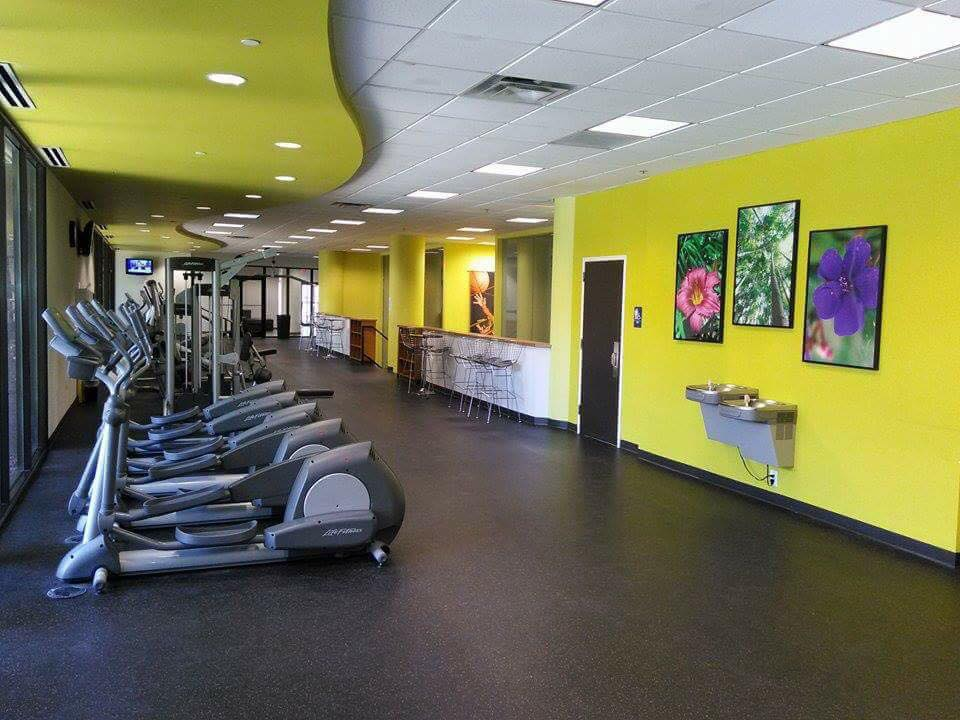
Some gyms may renew their long term memberships with an advance notice of less than a month

Ashbourne Management Services is a UK based company mainly involved in the fitness industry. The company overseas and offers services for the development and management of gym contracts and collection of gym subscription fees. The company was found to renew its long term contracts (usually more than 12 months) with an advance notice of less than a month. Complaints were filed against this practice by two individuals which were deemed as just by the court with the ruling in the favor of the claimants.

== Key issues ==
=== Termination ===
Contracts inclusive of the auto-renewal clauses can be terminated on the grounds of contract breach, mutual agreement of parties and some peculiar circumstances.

The parties may wish to renegotiate or change the legal agreement. This could be achieved by dissolving the current contract and drafting a new one with the renegotiated obligations. In the case where one party has failed to honor its contractual obligations, the contract would terminate regardless of the clause and in some cases, compensations and settlements might be due. It should be noted, however, that some countries have laws governing the time length of contractual breach after which the contractual relationship can be voided. Lastly, contracts can also be cancelled on the basis of certain circumstances in areas such as healthcare.

The contract will also be cancelled if the one party informs the other of its intent to discontinue the contractual relationship within the advance notice period detailed in the terms of agreement. Generally, this letter of intent is either provided some time before a specified number of days prior to the end of the contract, "This agreement shall automatically renew for another one (1) year term, unless either party provides notice to the other of its intent to terminate this agreement not less than thirty (30) days before the end of the then current term." or during a specified number of days before the end of the contractual period, "This agreement shall automatically renew for another one (1) year term, unless either party provides notice to the other of its intent to terminate this agreement within thirty (30) days of the end of the then current term." The letter of intent can be issued at any point in time before the specified number of days in the first case, while in the second one it must be issued within the highlighted number of days.

=== Deceptive practices ===
Apart from the legalities associated with the clause, a major issue linked to its usage is that of deceptive practices such as consumer fraud, unjust enrichment and violations of trade practices. Companies often inculcate this clause in their contracts to increase their revenues and profitability. Often, it is used in conjunction with other unfair trade practices such as overpricing.

This is largely due to contract transparency whereby firms do not communicate enough or explicit information to consumers regarding the consent and advance notice time period of the auto-renewal clauses present in their contracts or subscriptions. As a result, consumers feel deceived and at an unfair advantage when their contracts have been auto-renewed without their agreement

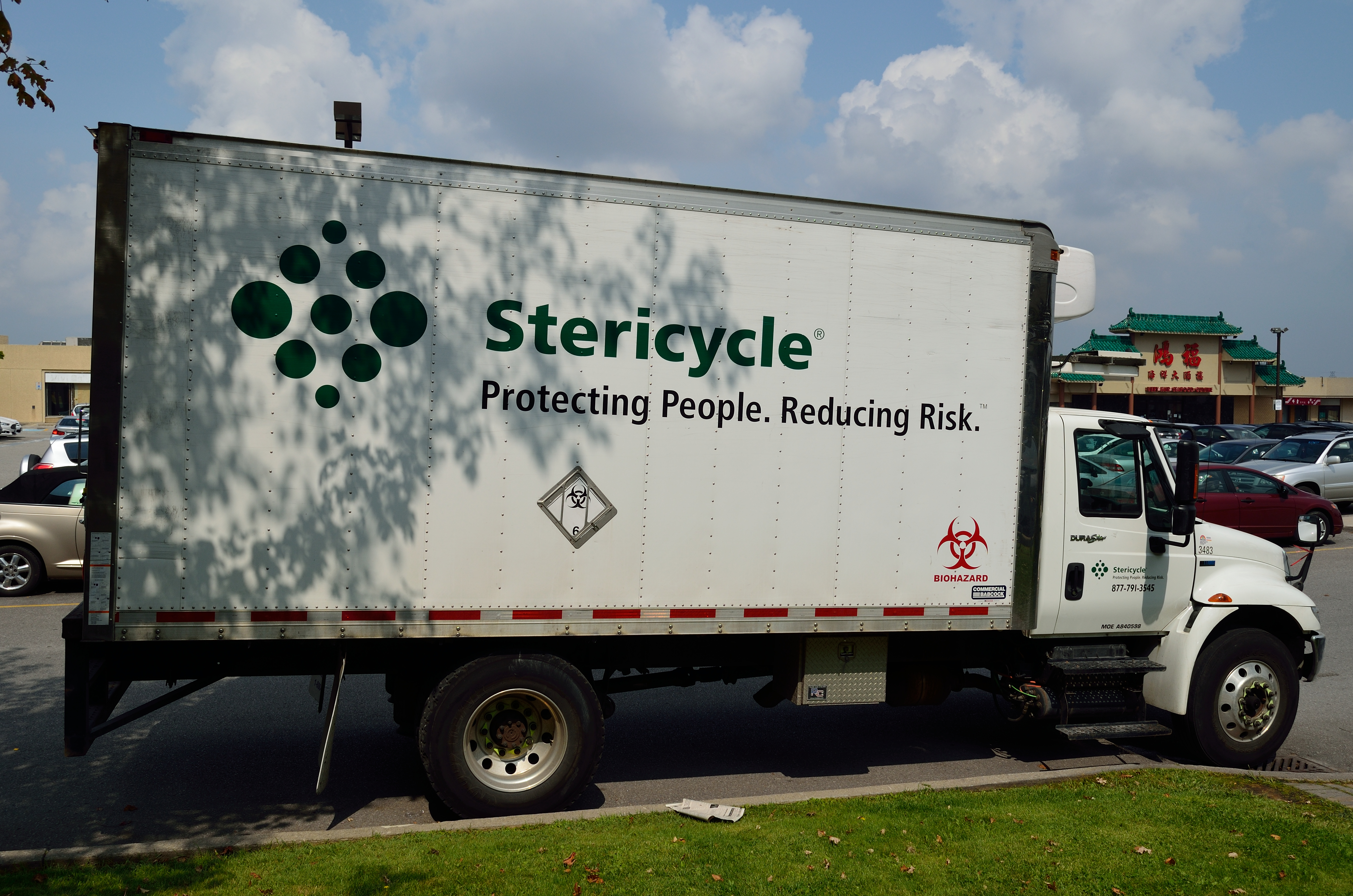
Stericylce's auto-renewal practices were deemed as unethical and unfair for consumers.

==== Stericycle ====
Stericycle is multinational corporation which specializes in health care specifically the waste disposal of medical and pharmaceutical products. In 2017, the company was accused of inflating its prices for a particular segment of its customers and auto-renewing their contracts without adequate contract transparency. The customers were largely government employees. As a result the government of Illinois had to bear losses because of the company's unethical business practices. In line with the Consumer Fraud and Deceptive Business Practices Act, Stericycle was penalized in excess of millions not only for the losses but also for the violation of the act.

== See also ==
- Easy-to-cancel mandate
- Negative option billing
