= Shampoo (massage) =

Traditional Indian hair massage

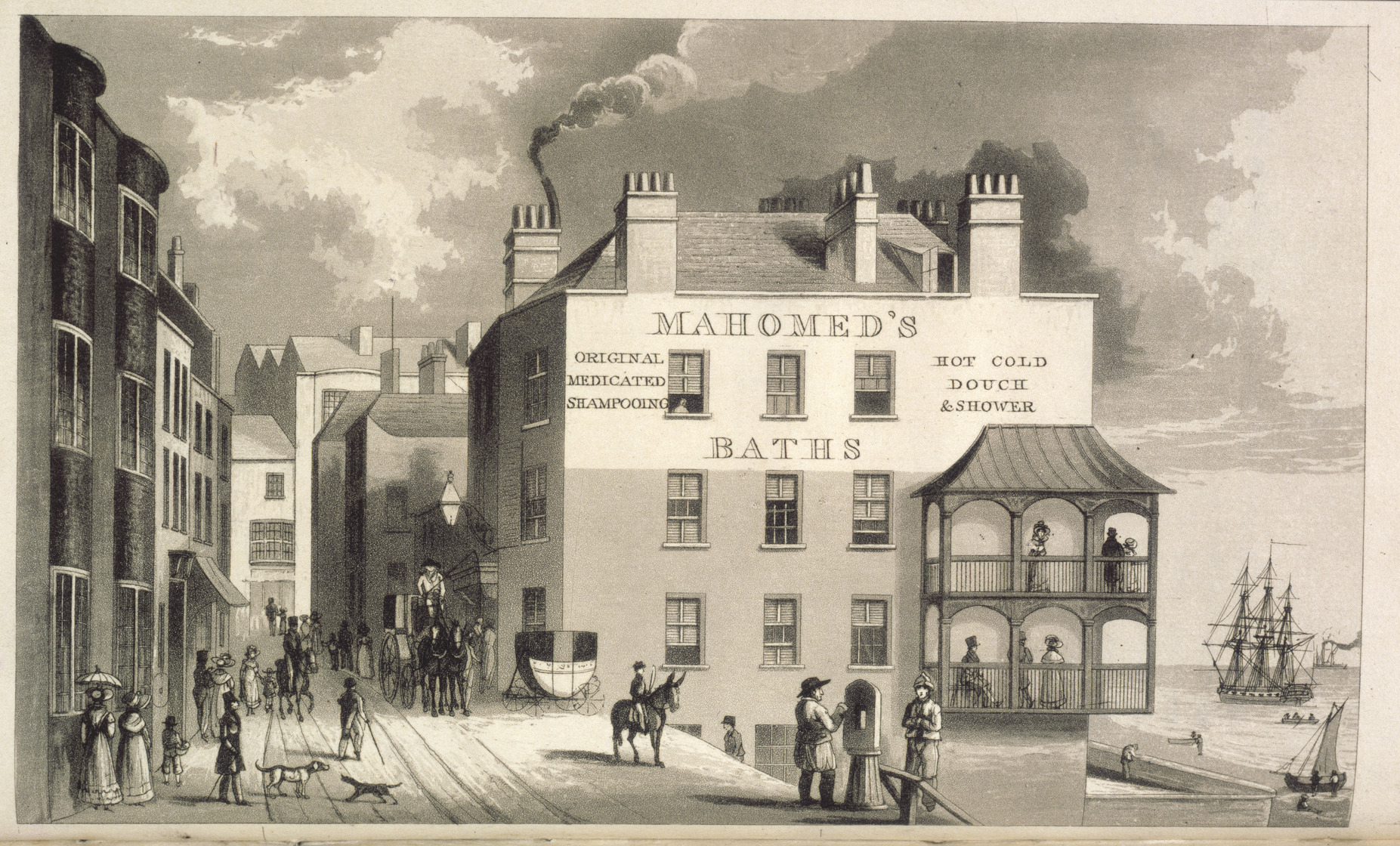
Mahomed's Baths - Shampooing (1826) - BL

Shampoo or chāmpi (also chāmpo or Champissage; the latter a trademark in alternative medicine from chāmpi and massage) is a type of Indian head massage usually with some form of hair oil. The English word shampoo, for a hair cleanser, is derived from this Hindi word and dates to 1762. The word and the service of head massage were introduced to Britain by an Indian entrepreneur Dean Mahomed. Mahomed introduced the practice to Basil Cochrane's vapour baths while working there in London in the early 19th century. In 1815, together with his Irish wife, he opened "Mahomed's Steam and Vapour Sea Water Medicated Baths" in Brighton, England where clients received an Indian treatment of champi (shampooing), meaning therapeutic massage. The practice became fashionable in Brighton and he was appointed ‘Shampooing Surgeon’ to both George IV and William IV.

From the mid-1850s, the term shampooing was also applied to part of the process of taking a Victorian Turkish bath. After progressing through the hot rooms, the bather was given a full body-wash and massage, combining parts of Mahomed's practice in Brighton with parts of the traditional massage given in an Islamic hammam. Dean Mohamed's son, Horatio, offered this type of shampooing at the Turkish baths he ran in London at 42 Somerset Street in the 1860s.

In India, the traditional hair massage is still common. Different oils and formulations with herbs may be used; these include neem, shikakai or soapnut, henna, bael, brahmi, fenugreek, buttermilk, amla, aloe, and almond in combination with some aromatic components like sandalwood, jasmine, turmeric, rose, and musk.
