= Baby shampoo =

Personal care product

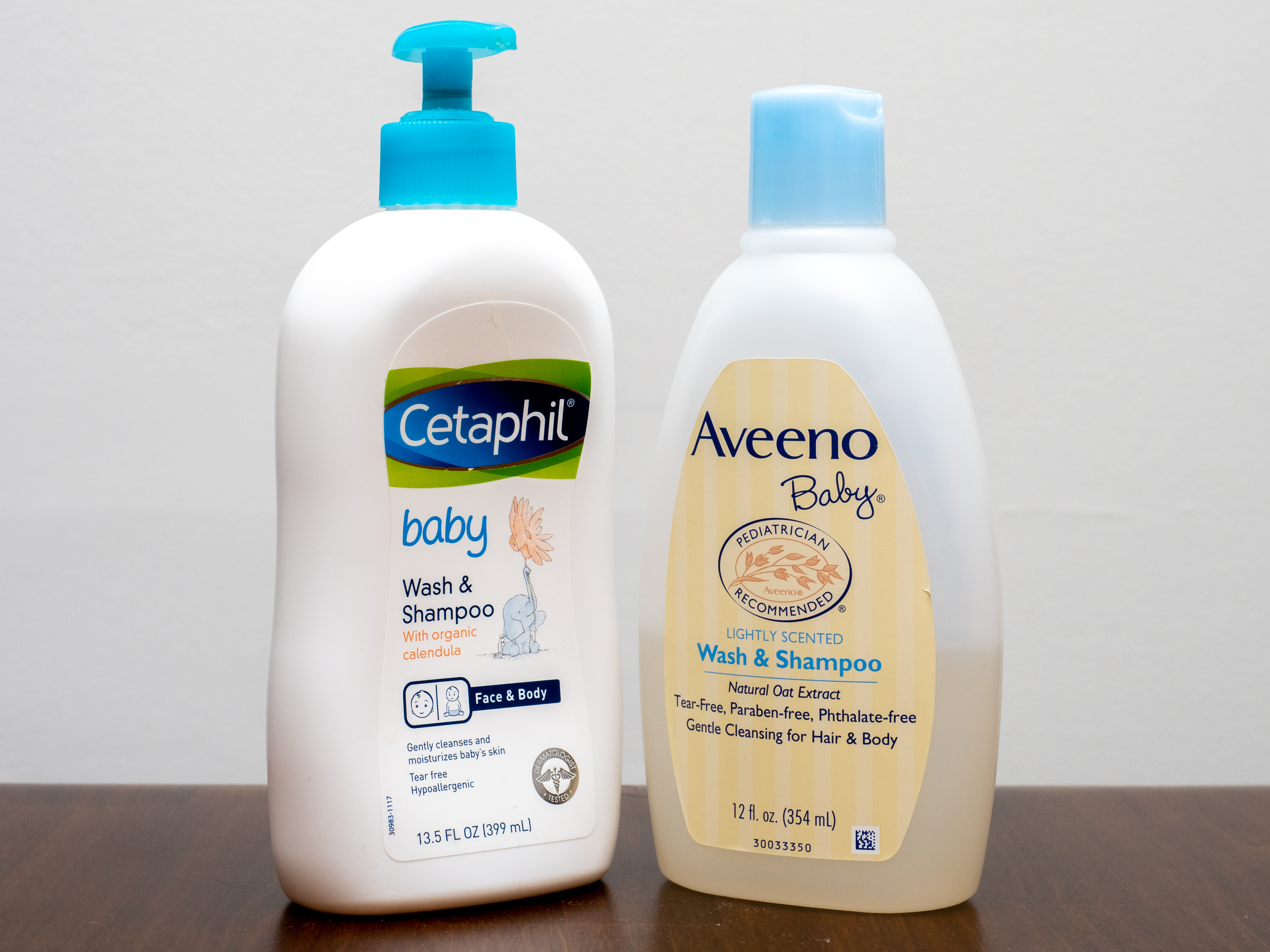
Baby Shampoo from Cetaphil and Aveeno

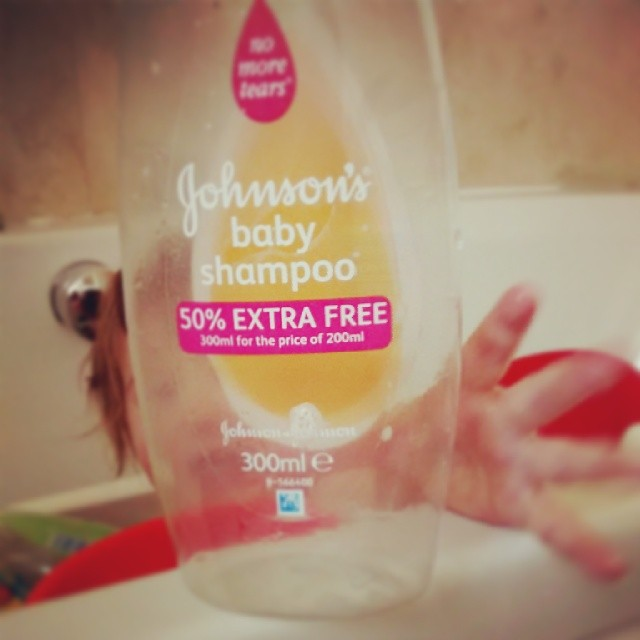
An empty bottle of Jonson's baby shampoo

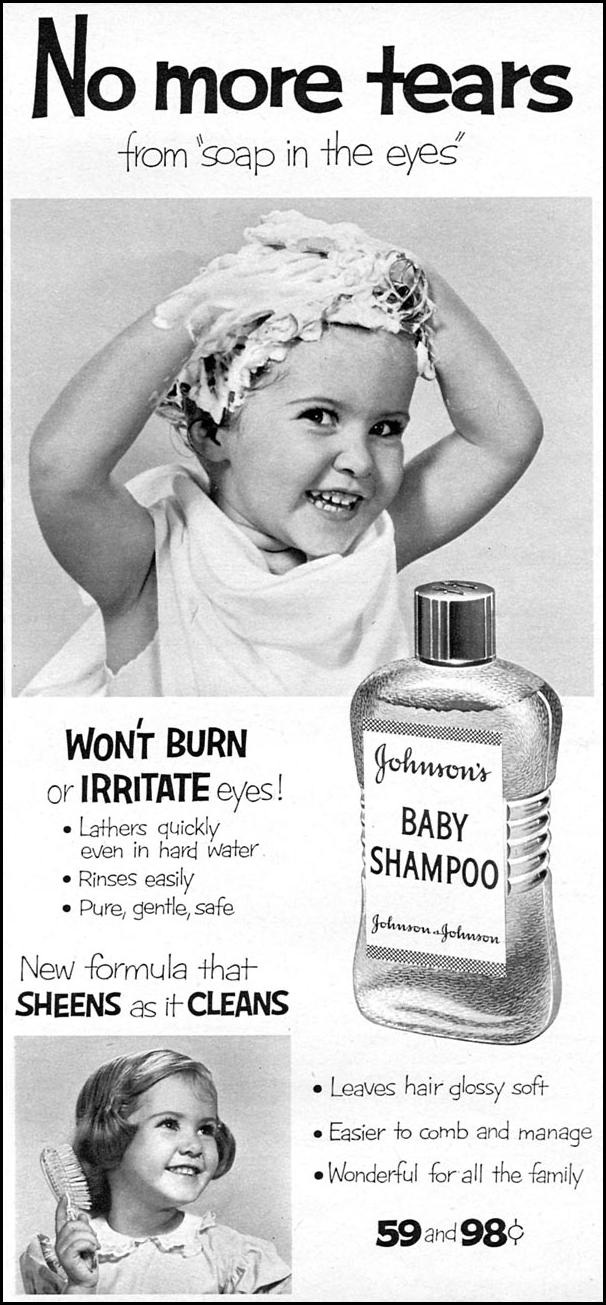
A historic of baby shampoo

Baby shampoo is a hair care product that is used for the removal of oils, dirt, skin particles, dandruff, environmental pollutants and other contaminant particles that gradually build up in hair; specially formulated for use on infants and young children by means of substituting chemicals which are purportedly less irritating to the eyes than those commonly found in regular shampoo.

== Purpose ==
Scalp skin of babies is characterized by subdued sebaceous gland production, due to hormonal levels. The sebaceous gland secretes sebum, a waxy ester, which maintains the acid mantle of the scalp and provides a coating that keeps skin supple and moist. The sebum builds overly, between every 2–3 days for the average adult. Those with delicate skin such as children may experience a longer interval. Sebum also imparts a protective coating to hair strands. For babies, the sebaceous gland production is not at peak, thus daily washing is not typically needed.

== Common ingredients ==
Most contain sodium trideceth sulfate, which is formulated to act as a low-irritation cleansing agent.

=== Functional claims ===
Shampoo for infants and young children is formulated so that it is less irritating and usually less prone to produce a stinging or burning sensation if it were to get into the eyes. For example, Johnson & Johnson advertises Johnson's baby Shampoo under the premise of "No More Tears". This is accomplished by one or more of the following formulation strategies:

- dilution, in case product comes in contact with eyes after running off the top of the head with minimal further dilution
- adjusting pH to that of "non-stress tears", approximately 7, which may be a higher pH than that of shampoos which are pH adjusted for skin or hair effects, and lower than that of shampoo made of soap
- use of surfactants which, alone or in combination, are less irritating than those used in other shampoos
- use of nonionic surfactants of the form of polyethoxylated synthetic glycolipids and/or polyethoxylated synthetic monoglycerides, which counteract the eye sting of other surfactants without producing the anesthetizing effect of alkyl polyethoxylates or alkylphenol polyethoxylates

The distinction in 4 above does not completely surmount the controversy over the use of shampoo ingredients to mitigate eye sting produced by other ingredients, or the use of the products so formulated.

The considerations in 3 and 4 frequently result in a much greater multiplicity of surfactants being used in individual baby shampoos than in other shampoos, and the detergency and/or foaming of such products may be compromised thereby. The monoanionic sulfonated surfactants and viscosity-increasing or foam stabilizing alkanolamides seen so frequently in other shampoos are much less common in the more popular brand baby shampoos.

== See also ==
- Shampoo
- Hair
- Hair care
- Hair washing
- Personal hygiene products
- Johnson & Johnson
- Shower gel
