= Curly Girl Method =

Curly hair maintenance method

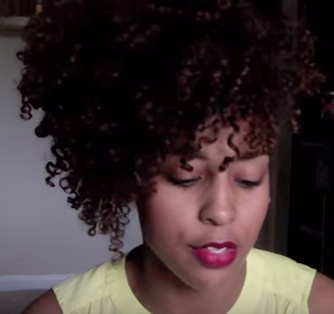
Curly Girl Method

The Curly Girl Method (CGM) is a uniqe technique to hair care designed by the author Lorraine Massey in her book named "Curly Girl." This method approaches textured hair for instance, coils, waves, and curls. This method discourages the daily use of sulfate shampoo, which is considered too harsh for curly hair. Among other things, it calls for the use of a cleansing conditioner in place of shampoo (also called "conditioner washing" or "co-washing"), without the use of harsh chemicals like silicone. The Curly Girl Method portrays a healthy routine for young girls that are starting to discover their hair type or texture. The book encourages many tips such as the use of hair gel or other styling products. The goal is to treat naturally curly hair gently, minimizing damage to the hair cuticle; to keep it moisturized, since curly hair is more prone to dryness than straight hair; and to accentuate rather than interfere with the hair's natural curl pattern.

== Texture ==
Research has found that the anatomy of curly hair is very different from straight hair. Curly hair fibers have curved shapes and elliptical cross-sections that lead to increased dryness and breakage compared to straight hair. This distinct follicle structure also affects the distribution of sebum, so natural oils have more difficulty dispersing throughout the hair. This biological complexity explains why traditional hair-care products and brushing methods can cause frizz and damage to curly hair, reinforcing the need for specific curly hair care techniques.

These recent findings have come to be recognized by beauty journalists and dermatologists who note that textured hair requires different cleansing, conditioning, and styling methods. These insights helped lay the groundwork for more wide-spread acceptance of specialized routines like the Curly Girl Method.

== History ==
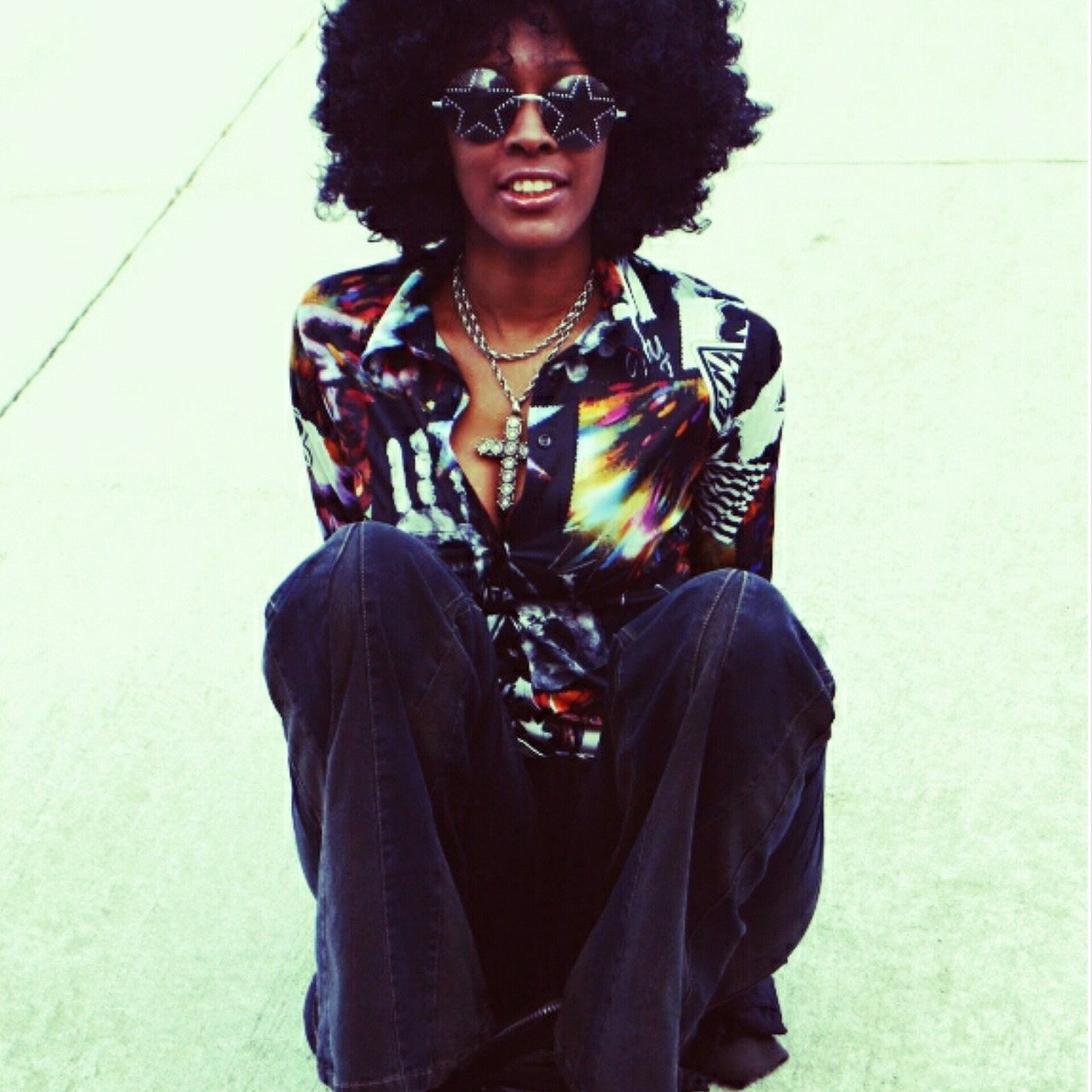
Woman with an afro

While variations of the method had been in use before then, in 2001, it was introduced to a wider audience by hairstylist Lorraine Massey, founder of the Devachan Salons. Lorraine had parted ways with DevaCurl in 2013, and is now the owner and founder of Curly World products and Spiral XYZ Curl Salon in New York City. When Curly Girl: The Handbook was first published, straight hair was the prevailing style for women in the United States, the United Kingdom, and elsewhere, and many women felt pressured to straighten their hair with flat irons or chemical relaxers. Massey writes in her introduction about growing up in England, where she was ridiculed for having curly hair. When she moved to New York City, she had an eye-opening experience: "Jewish, Italian, Latino, and African-American people living around me had curly hair that looked like mine! I no longer looked or felt like an outsider."

Since the early 2010s, curly hairstyles have become more popular and championed by many celebrities. During this time, online beauty forums, blogs, and YouTube tutorials created early spaces for users to exchange recommendations and techniques. These digital communities made the Curly Girl Method accessible beyond salon culture to global audiences.

By the early 2020s, TikTok had significantly amplified curly hair awareness. Videos went viral of users discovering their frizzy, unmanageable hair was actually wavy or curly when treated with the right products and routines. This trend led to widespread experimentation with specialized curly hair products and styling techniques associated with the Curly Girl Method. For example, people started switching to sulfate-free shampoos, since sulfates tend to strip hair of its natural oils.

TikTok’s algorithm and hashtags allowed these videos to spread rapidly, which has fostered a participatory culture where users shared their hair transformations, advice, and product reviews. This expanded the reach of the method to younger and more diverse audiences.

The Curly Girl Method has now become a widely recognized approach within mainstream beauty culture. Increased exposure of natural curls in media, fashion, and professional settings reflects changing beauty standards that are more inclusive of textured hair.

== Variations ==
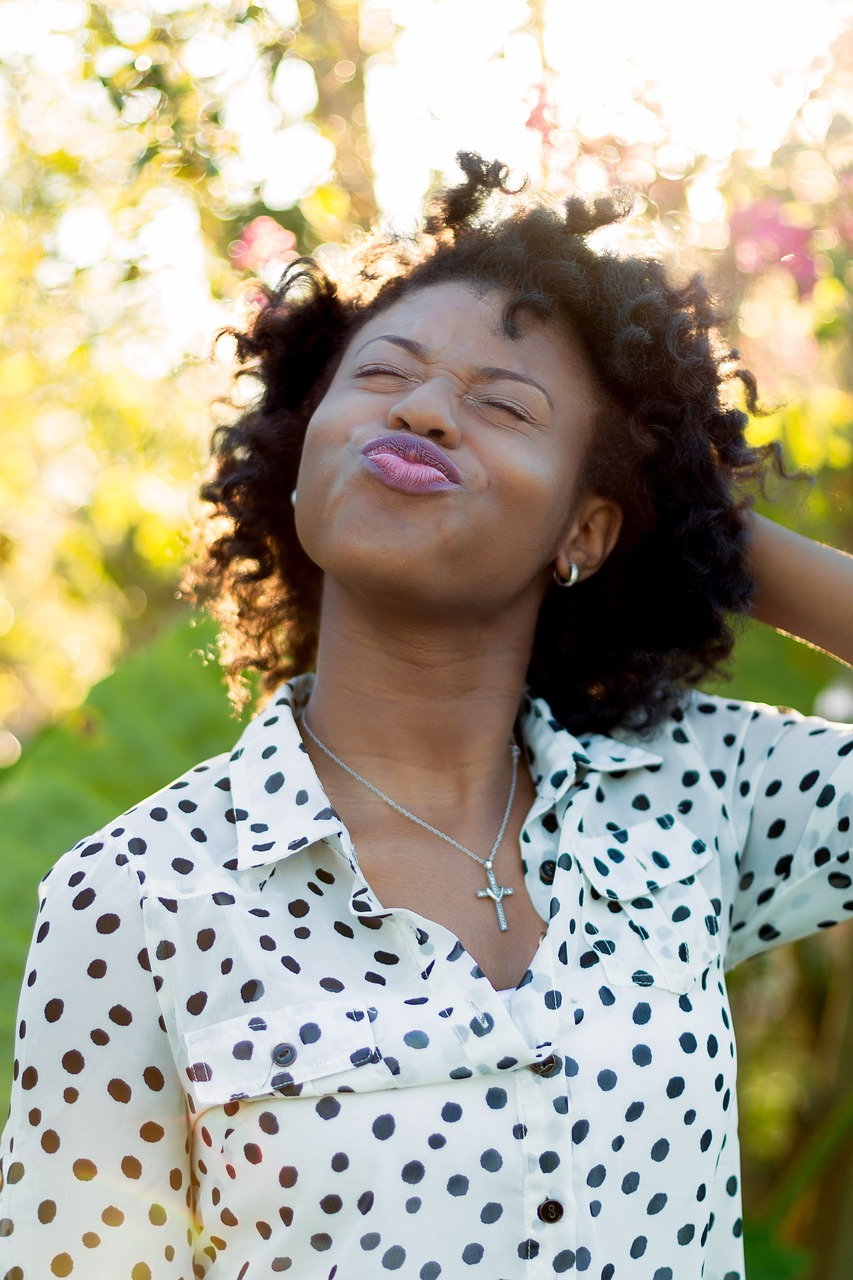
Woman with curly hair

People with various hair textures have adapted the method to their needs. Popular variations include the use of sulfate-free shampoos as well as occasional blow-drying with the use of heat protectants and a diffuser instead of a standard hair dryer. An additional step in the curly hair care routine includes the use of deep conditioners once a week. These deep conditioning treatments work more effectively if they are performed weekly. Application of heat by using thermal heat caps helps deep conditioners penetrate the cuticle better leaving the hair more moisturised.

The method is also used by men; the name "curly girl" reflects the relative importance of hair care to women and girls due to societal expectations. The method can also be used on kinky, coily, and wavy hair, which are often treated as curly hair types or "curl patterns" on hair care websites and in hair typing systems.

As co-washing has become more popular, consumer demand has spawned a new hair product, the "cleansing co-wash", which proponents claim removes buildup from the hair and scalp without the harsh "stripping" or drying effects of traditional shampoo.

Massey's book also includes techniques for cutting curly hair, such as cutting the hair when dry rather than wet. Related hair cutting techniques include the Deva cut, Ouidad cut, and RI CI cut. Deva Cut, which is created by Lorraine Massey, is widely popular now. It involves cutting each curl individually and at an angle so as to not disrupt the curl pattern.

Other authors have written curly hair care guides which focus on specific hair types. Curly Like Me: How to Grow Your Hair Healthy, Long, and Strong by Teri LaFlesh provides natural hair care tips especially for tight curls. Better than Good Hair: The Curly Girl Guide to Healthy, Gorgeous Natural Hair by Nikki Walton focuses on afro-textured hair. Writers at the Naturally Curly website provide hair care advice based on curl pattern, porosity, density, hair thickness and other factors.

The curly girl method also requires one to know one's hair porosity. There are low, medium and high hair porosity. Low hair porosity is when the hair cuticles are tightly shut. Low porosity hair has difficulty obtaining moisture but once moisture is absorbed it will remain moisturized. This porosity type is common with hair that has suffered little to no damage (either from heat styling tools or from chemicals) and thus it is the preferred porosity level. Medium porosity hair is when the hair cuticles are loose, allowing moisture to be easily absorbed and retained. High porosity is when there are gaps in the hair cuticles which allows the hair to easily absorb the moisture but also easily lose the moisture just as easily as it was absorbed. These gaps are caused by long term damage to the hair from things like over-manipulation, heat damage and chemical damage from hair dyes and relaxers.

== See also ==
- No poo
- Natural hair movement
