= Shampoo =

Hair care and cleaning product

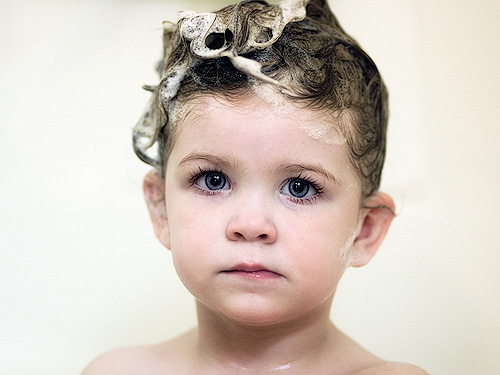
Shampoo lather in hair

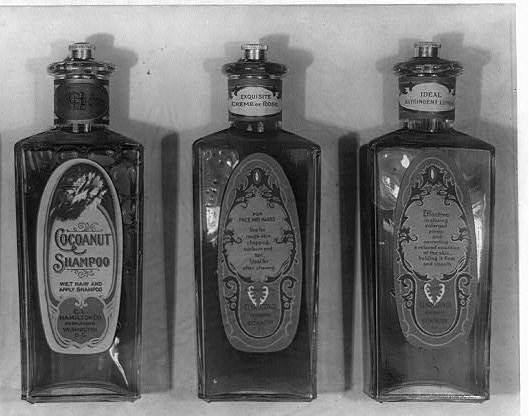
Bottles of shampoo and lotions manufactured in the early 20th century by the C.L. Hamilton Co. of Washington, D.C., United States

Shampoo (/ʃæmˈpuː/) is a hair care product, typically in the form of a viscous liquid, that is formulated to be used for cleaning (scalp) hair. Less commonly, it is available in solid bar format (not to be confused with "dry shampoo" which is a separate product). Shampoo is used by applying it to wet hair, massaging the product in the hair, roots and scalp, and then rinsing it out. Some users may follow shampooing with the use of hair conditioner.

Shampoo is typically used to remove the unwanted build-up of sebum (natural oils) in the hair without stripping out so much as to make hair unmanageable. Shampoo is generally made by combining a surfactant, most often sodium lauryl sulfate or sodium laureth sulfate, with a co-surfactant, most often cocamidopropyl betaine in water. The sulfate ingredient acts as a surfactant, trapping oils and other contaminants, similarly to soap.

Shampoos are mainly marketed to individuals for their hair. There are also medicated shampoos intended for animals. These shampoos may contain insecticides or other important medications such as chlorhexidine, used to treat skin conditions or parasite infestations such as fleas.

== History ==
=== Ancient Mesopotamia ===
Texts from Akkadian period show that Mesopotamians dealt with a wide range of skin diseases. Their culture emphasized personal hygiene to prevent illness, and there is frequent reference to their use of both medicated and regular soaps and shampoos as methods of prevention and treatment.

Ancient Mesopotamian tablets from the Neo-Assyrian period document the use of medicated shampoo to treat scalp eruptions.

=== Indian subcontinent ===
The word shampoo entered the English language during the colonial era in India. It dates to 1762 and derives from the Hindi word cā̃pō (चाँपो, pronounced [tʃãːpoː]) or shampoo, itself derived from the Sanskrit root chapati (चपति), which means 'to press, knead, or soothe'. Shampoo is a type of traditional Indian head massage using hair oil.

In India, a variety of herbs and their extracts have been used as shampoos since ancient times. A very effective early shampoo was made by boiling sapindus with dried Indian gooseberry (amla) and a selection of other herbs, using the strained extract. At the pre-Indus Valley Civilisation site of Banawali evidence is found of sapindus, Indian gooseberry and shikakai which were used for to prepare herbal products including those for hair care.

Sapindus, also known as soapberries or soapnuts, a tropical tree widespread in India, is called ksuna (Sanskrit: क्षुण) in ancient Indian texts and its fruit pulp contains saponins which are a natural surfactant. The extract of soapberries creates a lather which Indian texts called phenaka (Sanskrit: फेनक). It leaves the hair soft, shiny and manageable. Other products used for hair cleansing were shikakai, hibiscus flowers, ritha (Sapindus mukorossi) and arappu (Albizzia amara). Guru Nanak, the founder and the first guru of Sikhism, made references to the soapberry tree and soap in the 16th-century.

=== Europe ===
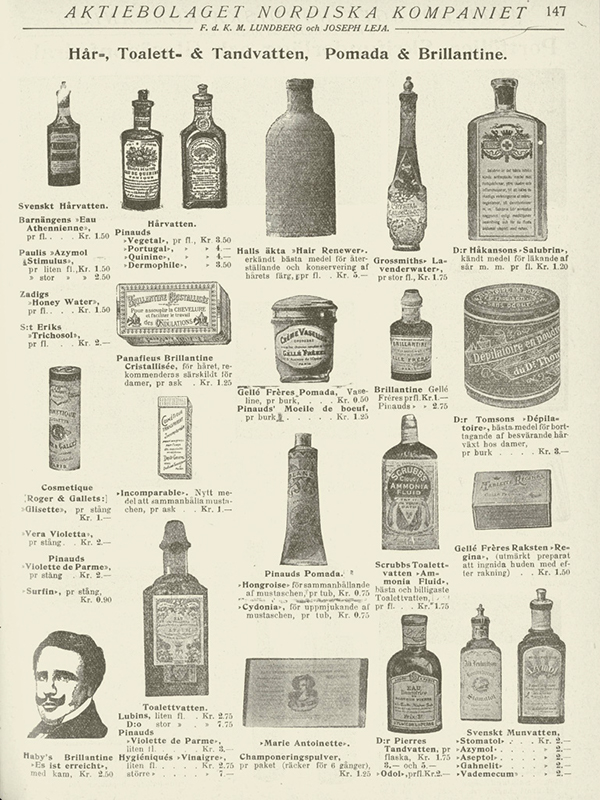
Swedish advertisement for toiletries, 1905/1906

Gauls used soap from goat's fat and beech ash for brightening the hair. Romans did not make soap, but cleansed their bodies and hair with a mixture of oils and sand.

During the 17th century, people of the upper classes commonly wore wigs; cleaning hair with water was discouraged and instead hair was applied with oils. In the 18th century, the wealthy classes had spas, but as the working class moved to the cities because of industrialisation, their hygiene suffered.

Dean Mahomed, an Indian traveller, surgeon, and entrepreneur, is credited with introducing the practice of shampoo or "shampooing" (a type of traditional Indian head massage using hair oils) to Britain. In 1814, Mahomed, with his Irish wife Jane Daly, were established as shampooing bathhouse keepers, and a few year later in 1821 opened the first commercial shampooing vapour masseur bath in England, in Brighton. He described the treatment in a local paper as "The Indian Medicated Vapour Bath (a type of steamy "Turkish" bath), a cure to many diseases and giving full relief when everything fails; particularly Rheumatic and paralytic, gout, stiff joints, old sprains, lame legs, aches and pains in the joints". His 1826 book on shampooing featured testimonies from his patients, as well as the details of the treatment made him famous. The book acted as a marketing tool for his unique baths in Brighton and capitalised on the early 19th-century trend for seaside spa treatments.

The "wash the hair" meaning of shampoo was first recorded in 1860. During the early stages of shampoo in Europe, English hair stylists boiled shaved soap in water and added herbs to give the hair shine and fragrance. Commercially made shampoo was available from the turn of the 20th century. A 1914 advertisement for Canthrox Shampoo in American Magazine showed young women at camp washing their hair with Canthrox in a lake; magazine advertisements in 1914 by Rexall featured Harmony Hair Beautifier and Shampoo.

In 1900, German perfumer and hair-stylist Josef Wilhelm Rausch developed the first liquid hair washing soap and named it "Champooing" in Emmishofen, Switzerland. Later, in 1919, Rausch developed an antiseptic chamomile shampooing with a pH of 8.5.

In 1927, liquid shampoo was improved for mass production by German inventor Hans Schwarzkopf in Berlin; his name became a shampoo brand sold in Europe.

Originally, soap and shampoo were very similar products; both containing the same naturally derived surfactants, a type of detergent. Modern shampoo as it is known today was first introduced in the 1930s with Drene, the first shampoo using synthetic surfactants instead of soap.

=== Indonesia ===
Early shampoos used in Indonesia were made from the husk and straw (merang) of rice. The husks and straws were burned into ash, and the ashes (which have alkaline properties) are mixed with water to form lather. The ashes and lather were scrubbed into the hair and rinsed out, leaving the hair clean, but very dry. Afterwards, coconut oil was applied to the hair in order to moisturize it.

=== Philippines ===
Filipinos have been traditionally using gugo before commercial shampoos were sold in stores. The shampoo is obtained by soaking and rubbing the bark of the vine Gugo (Entada phaseoloides), producing a lather that cleanses the scalp effectively. Gugo is also used as an ingredient in hair tonics.

=== Pre-Columbian North America ===
Certain Native American tribes used extracts from North American plants as hair shampoo; for example the Costanoans of present-day coastal California used extracts from the coastal woodfern, Dryopteris expansa.

=== Pre-Columbian South America ===
Before quinoa can be eaten the saponin must be washed out from the grain prior to cooking. Pre-Columbian Andean civilizations used this soapy by-product as a shampoo.

== Types ==
Shampoos can be classified into four main categories:

- powder shampoos, which are supplied as a concentrated dry powder and mixed with water before or during use, unlike dry shampoos, which are generally applied to dry hair without rinsing;
- deep cleansing shampoos, sometimes marketed under descriptions such as volumizing, clarifying, balancing, oil control, or thickening, which have a slightly higher amount of detergent and create a lot of foam;
- conditioning shampoos, sometimes marketed under descriptions such as moisturizing, 2-in-1, smoothing, anti-frizz, color care, and hydrating, which contain an ingredient like silicone or polyquaternium-10 to smooth the hair;
- baby shampoos, sometimes marketed as tear-free, which contain less detergent and produce less foam;
- anti-dandruff shampoos, which are medicated to reduce dandruff.

== Composition ==
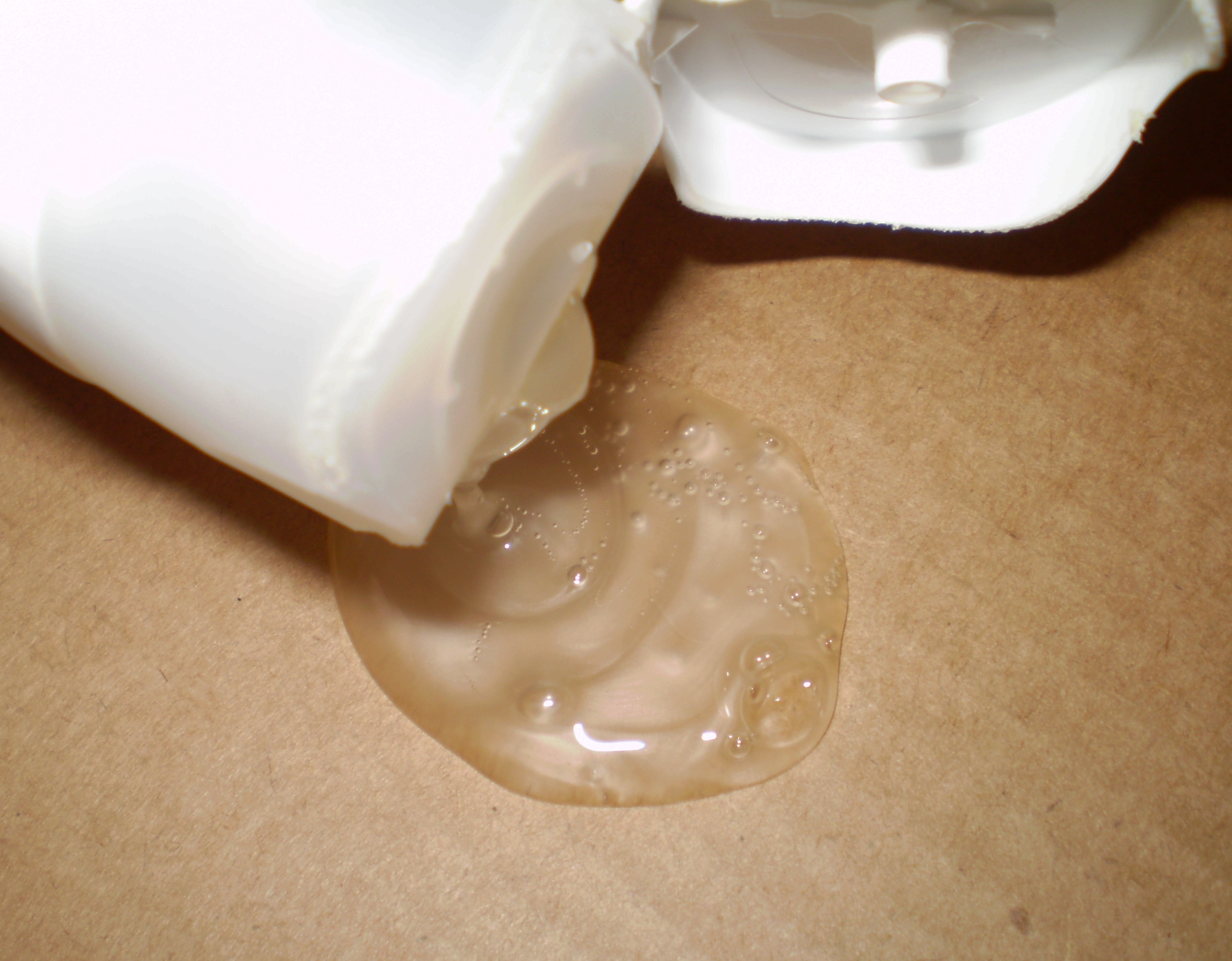
Typical liquid shampoo

Shampoo is generally made by combining a surfactant, most often sodium lauryl sulfate or sodium laureth sulfate, with a co-surfactant, most often cocamidopropyl betaine in water to form a thick, viscous liquid. Other essential ingredients include salt (sodium chloride), which is used to adjust the viscosity, a preservative and fragrance. Other ingredients are generally included in shampoo formulations to maximize the following qualities:

- pleasing foam
- ease of rinsing
- minimal skin and eye irritation
- thick or creamy feeling
- pleasant fragrance
- low toxicity
- good biodegradability
- slight acidity (pH less than 7)
- no damage to hair
- repair of damage already done to hair

Many shampoos are pearlescent. This effect is achieved by the addition of tiny flakes of suitable materials, e.g. glycol distearate, chemically derived from stearic acid, which may have either animal or vegetable origins. Glycol distearate is a wax. Many shampoos also include silicone to provide conditioning benefits.

=== Commonly used ingredients ===
- Ammonium chloride
- Ammonium lauryl sulfate
- Glycol
- Sodium laureth sulfate is derived from coconut oils and is used to soften water and create pleasing foam.
- Sodium lauryl sulfate is used in stronger shampoos
- Hypromellose cellulose ethers are widely used as thickeners, rheology modifiers, emulsifiers and dispersants in Shampoo products.
- Sodium lauroamphoacetate is naturally derived from coconut oils and is used as a cleanser and counter-irritant. This is the ingredient that makes the product tear-free.
- Polysorbate 20 (abbreviated as PEG(20)) is a mild glycol-based surfactant that is used to solubilize fragrance oils and essential oils, meaning it causes liquid to spread across and penetrate the surface of a solid (i.e. hair).
- Polysorbate 80 (abbreviated as PEG(80)) is a glycol used to emulsify (or disperse) oils in water so the oils do not float on top.
- PEG-150 distearate is a simple thickener.
- Citric acid is produced biochemically and is used as an antioxidant to preserve the oils in the product. While it is a severe eye-irritant, the sodium lauroamphoacetate counteracts that property. Citric acid is used to adjust the pH down to approximately 5.5. It is a fairly weak acid which makes the adjustment easier. Shampoos usually are at pH 5.5 because at slightly acidic pH, the scales on a hair follicle lie flat, making the hair feel smooth and look shiny. It also has a small amount of preservative action. Citric acid, as opposed to any other acid, will prevent bacterial growth.
- Quaternium-15 is used as a bacterial and fungicidal preservative.
- Polyquaternium-10 acts as the conditioning ingredient, providing moisture and fullness to the hair.
- Di-PPG-2 myreth-10 adipate is a water-dispersible emollient that forms clear solutions with surfactant systems.
- Chloromethylisothiazolinone, or CMIT, is a powerful biocide and preservative.

=== Claims regarding ingredients ===
In the United States, the Food and Drug Administration (FDA) mandates that shampoo containers accurately list ingredients on the products container. The government further regulates what shampoo manufacturers can and cannot claim as any associated benefit. Shampoo producers often use these regulations to challenge marketing claims made by competitors, helping to enforce these regulations. While the claims may be substantiated, however, the testing methods and details of such claims are not as straightforward. For example, many products are purported to protect hair from damage due to ultraviolet radiation. While the ingredient responsible for this protection does block UV, it is not often present in a high enough concentration to be effective. The North American Hair Research Society has a program to certify functional claims based on third-party testing. Shampoos made for treating medical conditions such as dandruff or itchy scalp are regulated as OTC drugs in the US marketplace.

In the European Union, there is a requirement for shampoo claims to be substantiated as with any other advertising claim, and shampoos are classified as cosmetics.

== Health risks ==
A number of contact allergens are used as ingredients in shampoos, and contact allergy caused by shampoos is well known. Patch testing can identify ingredients to which patients are allergic, after which a physician can help a person to find a shampoo that is free of the ingredient to which they are allergic. The US bans 11 ingredients from shampoos, Canada bans 587, and the EU bans 1328.

== Specialized shampoos ==
=== Dandruff ===
Cosmetic companies have developed shampoos specifically for those who have dandruff. These contain fungicides such as ketoconazole, zinc pyrithione and selenium disulfide, which reduce loose dander by killing fungi like Malassezia furfur. Coal tar and salicylate derivatives are often used as well. Alternatives to medicated shampoos are available for people who wish to avoid synthetic fungicides. Such shampoos often use tea tree oil, essential oils or herbal extracts.

=== Colored hair ===
Many companies have also developed color-protection shampoos suitable for colored hair; some of these shampoos contain gentle cleansers according to their manufacturers. Shampoos for color-treated hair are a type of moisturizing shampoo.

=== Baby ===
Shampoo for infants and young children is formulated so that it is less irritating and usually less prone to produce a stinging or burning sensation if it were to get into the eyes. For example, Johnson's Baby Shampoo advertises under the premise of "No More Tears". This is accomplished by one or more of the following formulation strategies.

1. Dilution, in case the product comes in contact with eyes after running off the top of the head with minimal further dilution
2. Adjusting pH to approximately 7, which may be a higher pH than that of shampoos which are pH adjusted for skin or hair effects, and lower than that of shampoo made of soap
3. Use of surfactants which, alone or in combination, are less irritating than those used in other shampoos (e.g. Sodium lauroamphoacetate)
4. Use of nonionic surfactants of the form of polyethoxylated synthetic glycolipids and polyethoxylated synthetic monoglycerides, which counteract the eye sting of other surfactants without producing the anesthetizing effect of alkyl polyethoxylates or alkylphenol polyethoxylates

The distinction in 4 above does not completely surmount the controversy over the use of shampoo ingredients to mitigate eye sting produced by other ingredients, or the use of the products so formulated. The considerations in 3 and 4 frequently result in a much greater multiplicity of surfactants being used in individual baby shampoos than in other shampoos, and the detergency or foaming of such products may be compromised thereby. The monoanionic sulfonated surfactants and viscosity-increasing or foam stabilizing alkanolamides seen so frequently in other shampoos are much less common in the better baby shampoos.

=== Sulfate-free shampoos ===
Sulfate-free shampoos are free from both sodium lauryl sulfate and sodium laureth sulfate. These shampoos use alternative surfactants like sodium cocoyl glutamate, sodium lauroyl sarcosinate, sodium C14-16 olefin sulfonate, sodium cocoyl isethionate to cleanse the hair, although the efficacy of such shampoos is still open to debate as these surfactants have their own set of pros and cons.

=== Animal ===
Shampoo intended for animals may contain insecticides or other medications for treatment of skin conditions or parasite infestations such as fleas or mange. These must never be used on humans. While some human shampoos may be harmful when used on animals, any human haircare products that contain active ingredients or drugs (such as zinc in anti-dandruff shampoos) are potentially toxic when ingested by animals. Special care must be taken not to use those products on pets. Cats are at particular risk due to their instinctive method of grooming their fur with their tongues.

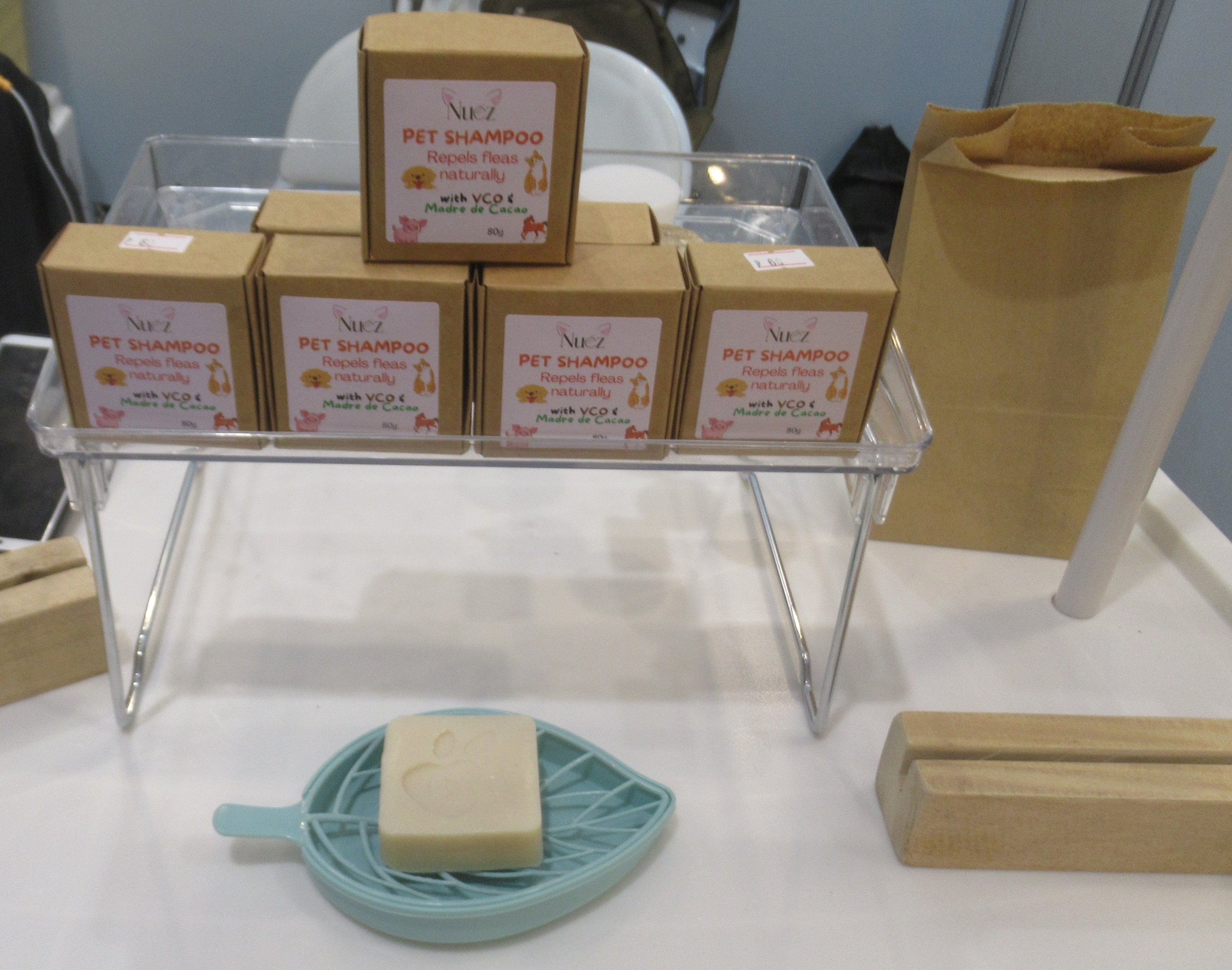
Pet shampoo with VCO and mother of cocoa

Shampoos that are especially designed to be used on pets, commonly dogs and cats, are normally intended to do more than just clean the pet's coat or skin. Most of these shampoos contain ingredients which act different and are meant to treat a skin condition or an allergy or to fight against fleas.

The main ingredients contained by pet shampoos can be grouped in insecticidals, antiseborrheic, antibacterials, antifungals, emollients, emulsifiers and humectants. Whereas some of these ingredients may be efficient in treating some conditions, pet owners are recommended to use them according to their veterinarian's indications because many of them cannot be used on cats or can harm the pet if it is misused. Generally, insecticidal pet shampoos contain pyrethrin, pyrethroids (such as permethrin and which may not be used on cats) and carbaryl. These ingredients are mostly found in shampoos that are meant to fight against parasite infestations.

Antifungal shampoos are used on pets with yeast or ringworm infections. These might contain ingredients such as miconazole, chlorhexidine, providone iodine, ketoconazole or selenium sulfide (which cannot be used on cats).

Bacterial infections in pets are sometimes treated with antibacterial shampoos. They commonly contain benzoyl peroxide, chlorhexidine, povidone iodine, triclosan, ethyl lactate, or sulfur.

Antipruritic shampoos are intended to provide relief of itching due to conditions such as atopy and other allergies. These usually contain colloidal oatmeal, hydrocortisone, Aloe vera, pramoxine hydrochloride, menthol, diphenhydramine, sulfur or salicylic acid. These ingredients are aimed to reduce the inflammation, cure the condition and ease the symptoms at the same time while providing comfort to the pet.

Antiseborrheic shampoos are those especially designed for pets with scales or those with excessive oily coats. These shampoos are made of sulfur, salicylic acid, refined tar (which cannot be used on cats), selenium sulfide (cannot be used on cats) and benzoyl peroxide. All these are meant to treat or prevent seborrhea oleosa, which is a condition characterized by excess oils. Dry scales can be prevented and treated with shampoos that contain sulfur or salicylic acid and which can be used on both cats and dogs.

Emollient shampoos are efficient in adding oils to the skin and relieving the symptoms of a dry and itchy skin. They usually contain oils such as almond, corn, cottonseed, coconut, olive, peanut, Persia, safflower, sesame, lanolin, mineral or paraffin oil. The emollient shampoos are typically used with emulsifiers as they help distributing the emollients. These include ingredients such as cetyl alcohol, laureth-5, lecithin, PEG-4 dilaurate, stearic acid, stearyl alcohol, carboxylic acid, lactic acid, urea, sodium lactate, propylene glycol, glycerin, or polyvinylpyrrolidone.

Although some of the pet shampoos are highly effective, some others may be less effective for some condition than another. Yet, although natural pet shampoos exist, it has been brought to attention that some of these might cause irritation to the skin of the pet. Natural ingredients that might be potential allergens for some pets include eucalyptus, lemon or orange extracts and tea tree oil. On the contrary, oatmeal appears to be one of the most widely skin-tolerated ingredients that is found in pet shampoos. Most ingredients found in a shampoo meant to be used on animals are safe for the pet as there is a high likelihood that the pets will lick their coats, especially in the case of cats.

Pet shampoos which include fragrances, deodorants or colors may harm the skin of the pet by causing inflammations or irritation. Shampoos that do not contain any unnatural additives are known as hypoallergenic shampoos and are increasing in popularity.

=== Solid shampoo bars ===
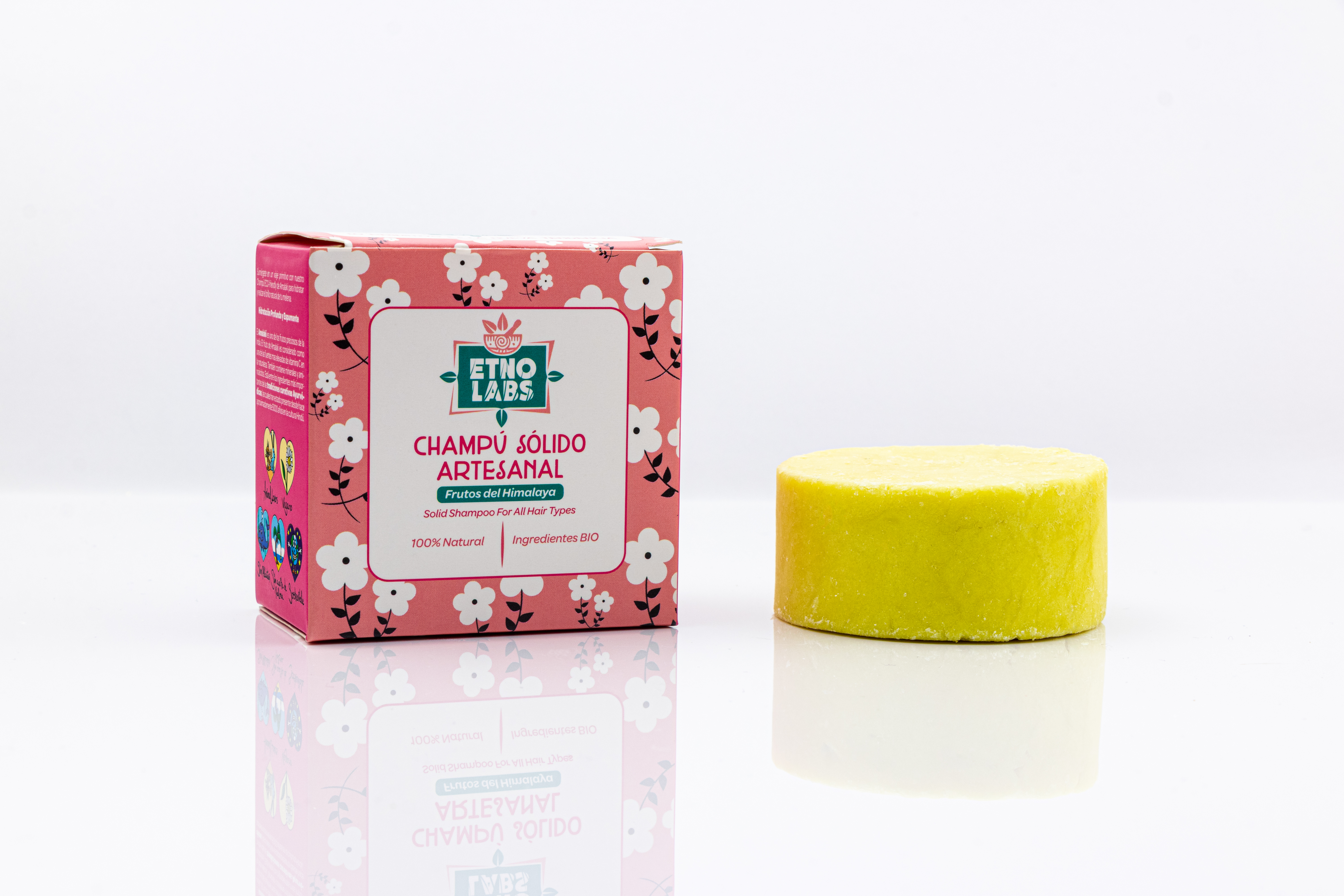
A shampoo bar

Invented in 1987 by Lush co-founder, Mo Constantine and cosmetic chemist, Stan Krystal, solid shampoos or shampoo bars can either be soap-based or use other plant-based surfactants, such as sodium cocoyl isethionate or sodium coco-sulfate combined with oils and waxes. Soap-based shampoo bars are high in pH (alkaline) compared to human hair and scalps, which are slightly acidic. Alkaline pH increases the friction of the hair fibres which may cause damage to the hair cuticle, making it feel rough and drying out the scalp.

=== Jelly and gel ===
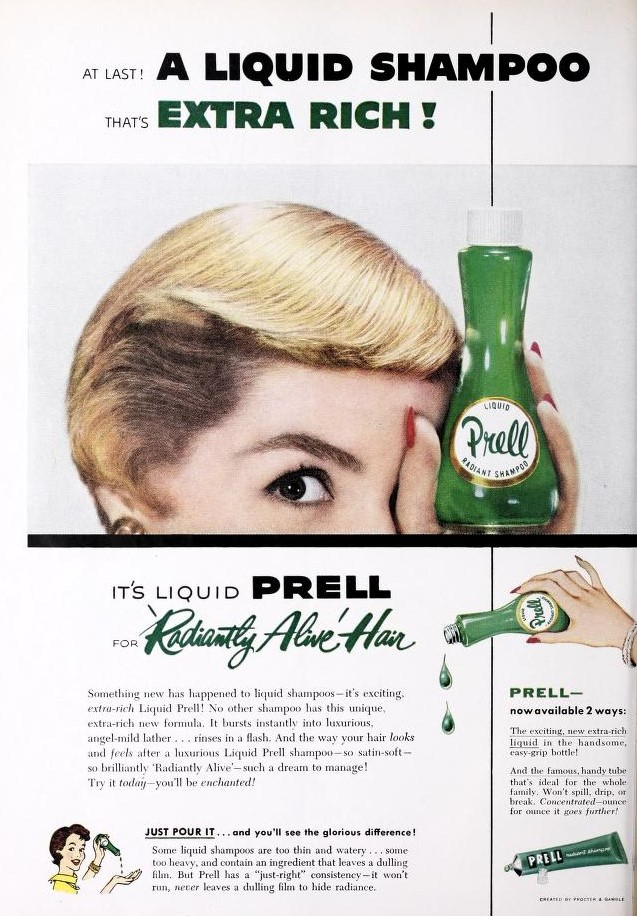
Advertisement offering shampoo in two forms: a bottle of liquid and a tube of gel

Stiff, non-pourable clear gels to be squeezed from a tube were once popular forms of shampoo, and can be produced by increasing a shampoo's viscosity. This type of shampoo cannot be spilled, but unlike a solid, it can still be lost down the drain by sliding off wet skin or hair.

=== Paste and cream ===
Shampoos in the form of pastes or creams were formerly marketed in jars or tubes. The contents were wet but not completely dissolved. They would apply faster than solids and dissolve quickly.

=== Antibacterial ===
Antibacterial shampoos are often used in veterinary medicine for various conditions, as well as in humans before some surgical procedures.

== Hair wash without shampoo ==
Closely associated with environmentalism, the "no poo" movement consists of people rejecting the societal norm of frequent shampoo use. Some adherents of the no poo movement use baking soda or vinegar to wash their hair, while others use diluted honey. Further methods include the use of raw eggs (potentially mixed with salt water), rye flour, or chickpea flour dissolved in water. Other people use nothing or rinse their hair only with conditioner.

=== Theory ===
In the 1970s, ads featuring Farrah Fawcett and Christie Brinkley asserted that it was unhealthy not to shampoo several times a week. This mindset is reinforced by the greasy feeling of the scalp after a day or two of not shampooing. Using shampoo every day removes sebum, the oil produced by the scalp. This causes the sebaceous glands to produce oil at a higher rate, to compensate for what is lost during shampooing. According to Michelle Hanjani, a dermatologist at Columbia University, a gradual reduction in shampoo use will cause the sebum glands to produce at a slower rate, resulting in less grease in the scalp. Although this approach might seem unappealing to some individuals, many people try alternate shampooing techniques like baking soda and vinegar in order to avoid ingredients used in many shampoos that make hair greasy over time.

Whereas the use of baking soda for hair cleansing has been associated with hair damage and skin irritation, likely due to its high pH value and exfoliating properties, honey, egg, rye flour, and chickpea flour hair washes seem gentler for long-term use.

== See also ==
- Soap
- Exfoliation (cosmetology)
- Hair washing without commercial shampoo
