= Orgasmatron =

Orgasmatron may refer to:

- Fictional orgasm-inducing devices in the 1968 film Barbarella, the 1973 film Sleeper and other works.
- Orgasmatron (massage device), a head-massage device
- Orgasmatron (album), a 1986 album by Motörhead and its title track
- "Orgasmatron", a cover track by Sepultura, released with the album Arise
- "Orgasmatron", a track by Avenue D on the 2004 album Bootleg
- The Orgasmatron, a 2010 live music project created by songwriter Guy Chambers
