= DevaCurl =

Hair care brand

- Company type: Hair care
- Founded: 1994; 32 years ago
- Founder: Lorriane Massey and Denis Da Silva
- Headquarters: New York, New York, US
- Key people: Robert Schaeffier (CEO)
- Parent: Henkel
- Website: www.devacurl.com

DevaCurl is an American brand of hair care products.

== History ==
The first Devachan salon was founded by Lorraine Massey and Dennis Da Silva in 1994 in New York City. Massey, a hairstylist, developed the "Curly Girl Method" and authored the book "Curly Girl: The Handbook" as guidelines for naturally curly hair care.

In 2002, DevaCurl launched its first "no-poo" cleanser.

In 2007, DevaCurl established an academy to teach curly hair care stylists the signature Deva cut used in all of its salons.

In 2013, the DevaCurl brand was purchased by Tengram Capital Partners.

In May 2017, the DevaCurl brand was purchased by Ares Management for an undisclosed amount, before being resold to Henkel. In December 2018, Robert Schaeffler was named CEO. He previously served as General Manager for Henkel Professional North America.

== Controversies ==
In November 2019, a Dallas law firm began investigating products sold under the DevaCurl brand name. They alleged that DevaCurl products, particularly the no poo products, may lead to hair loss and damage as well as other injuries to the hair and scalp.

In 2020, several class-action lawsuits were started by women who claimed to have suffered hair loss and other side effects from using DevaCurl products. Fashion influencer Ayesha Malik posted in a YouTube video titled "Why I Stopped Using DevaCurl" in which she claimed that using DevaCurl products had damaged her hair, and apologized for promoting the brand on her social media.

== See also ==
- Natural hair movement
