= Hair washing =

Cosmetic act of keeping hair clean by washing

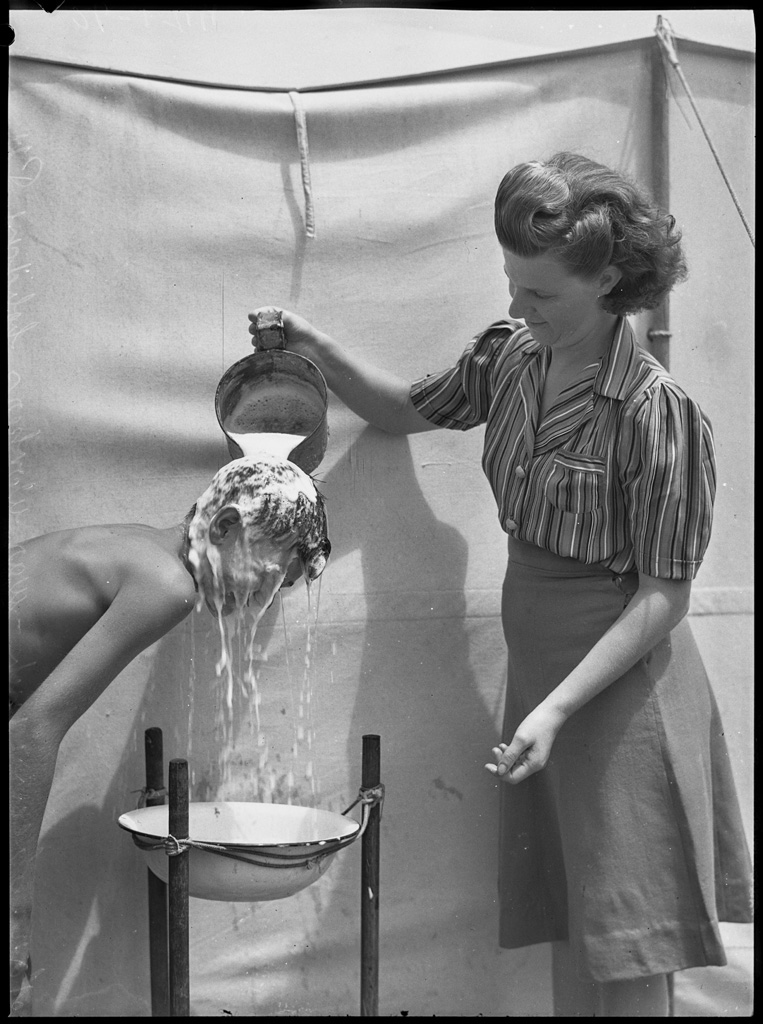
Boy getting his hair washed, Narrabeen war workers holiday camp, 26 January 1944

Hair washing is the cosmetic act of keeping hair clean by washing it. To remove sebum from hair, people apply a surfactant, usually shampoo (sometimes soap) to wet hair and lather. The surfactant and the dirt that has bonded to it are then rinsed out with water.

There are also dry shampoos: powders that help remove sebum from hair by absorbing it prior to being combed out. People may use dry shampoo to postpone their hair wash or to save time. Dry shampoo is sometimes used in situations when someone is bedridden.

Hair washing and dry shampoo are both used with the intention of keeping the hair healthy, adding volume to the hair, removing dirt and odors, and removing oils from the scalp.

Washing hair regularly can also help control scalp conditions and reduce the risk of infection.

== Hairdressing ==
Most hairdressers in Canada, United States, Europe, and Latin America offer a hair wash before or after a haircut. Before, it can make the hair more manageable for the hairdresser performing the haircut. After, it can remove loose strands of hair.

Hairdressers use specialized basins to perform a hair wash; these can be either forward or backward style. In the more common backward version, the client sits in a chair, and leans their head back into a sink, with the hairdresser standing behind them. In the forward version, the client leans forward over a sink, and the hairdresser stands over them to wash their hair.

The 'upright' shampoo is practiced In some parts of the world, such as China. In this version, the client sits in a chair, while a hairdresser applies shampoo to their hair and adds water. They then rinse off into a basin.

== Clarifying shampoo ==
Most shampoos are designed for daily use and are relatively gentle on the scalp and hair. However, they may not clean as thoroughly as clarifying shampoos, which contain stronger surfactants to remove buildup, oils, and residue. Clarifying shampoos are intended for occasional use as a treatment, rather than for every wash.

== See also ==
- Hair care
- No poo
- Shampoo
