= Dry shampoo =

Hair product

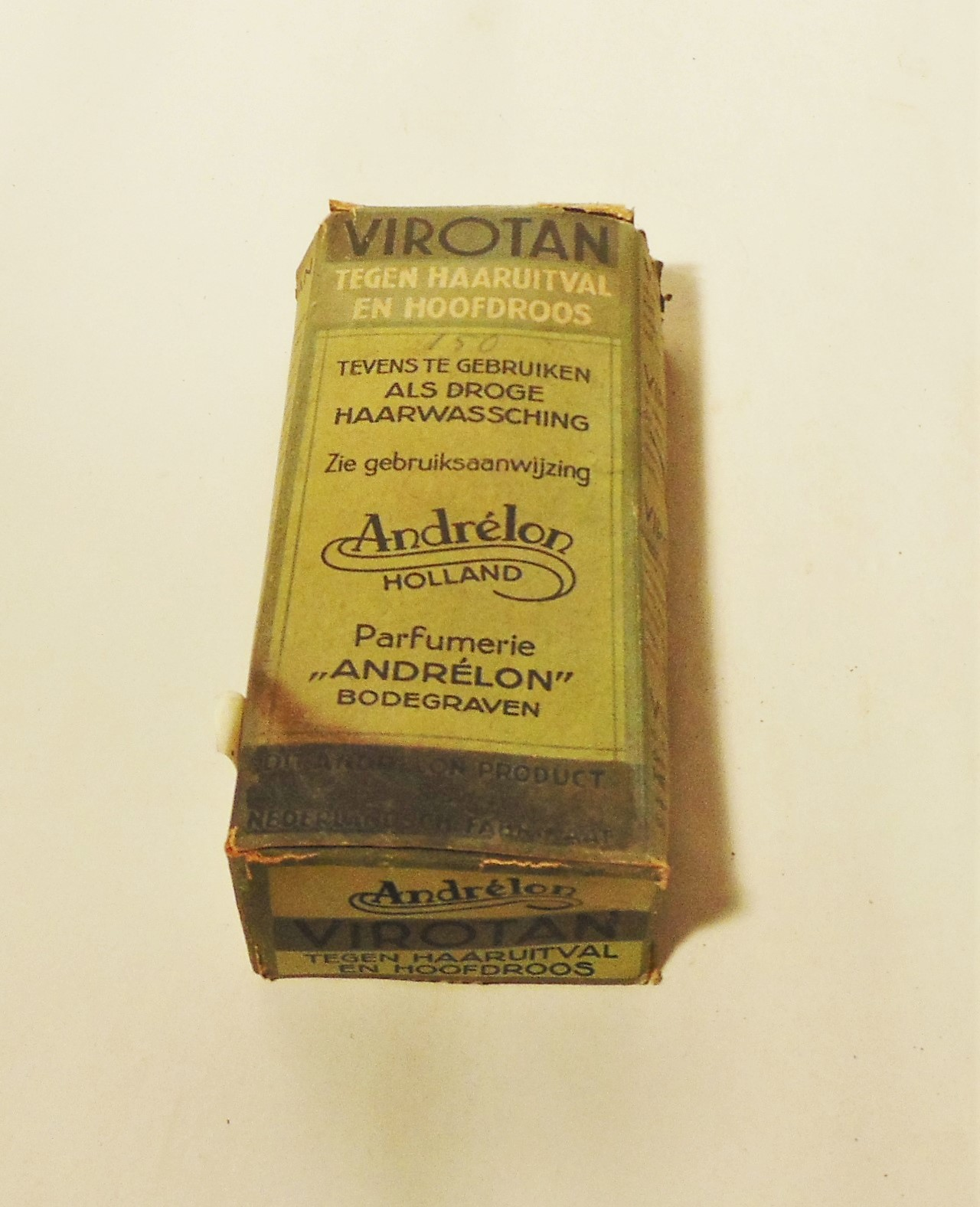
Andrelon dry shampoo from the 1940s.

Dry shampoo, also known as hybrid shampoo, is a type of shampoo which reduces hair greasiness without the need for water. It is in powder form and is typically administered from an aerosol can. Dry shampoo is often based on corn starch or rice starch. In addition to cleansing hair, it can also be used as a tool for hair-styling as it can create volume, help tease hair, keep bobby pins in place, and be used in place of mousse in wet hair. Dry shampoo proponents attest that daily wash-and-rinse with detergent shampoo can strip away natural oils from hair. Others attest that spraying dry shampoo every day will lead to a build-up of product that can dull hair color and irritate the scalp, arguing that the scalp needs regular cleansing and exfoliating to get rid of bacteria, remove dead skin cells, and stay healthy.

The powders in dry shampoo are meant to absorb the sebum in hair, which is excreted from sebaceous glands and can give hair a greasy appearance when the oil is overproduced. By absorbing the oils, the greasy appearance of the hair is reduced; however, the absorbed oils and powders remain in the scalp, so the hair may appear clean but feel unclean to the user. The user may need to wash their hair with traditional shampoos to actually remove the oils and dry shampoo powder in order for the scalp and hair to feel and appear clean.

== History ==
Throughout history, people have used powder-based products similar to dry shampoo to cleanse and improve the appearance of hair. Evidence suggests that people in Asia used clay powder to clean their hair as early as the late 15th century. During the Elizabethan era, a lack of regular bathing made clay powders popular among women to cleanse their hair of excess dirt and oil. Some powders were even coloured for decorative purposes. Powders were also used by 18th-century British and American elites to absorb the oils in hair and wigs at a time when long hair was a marker of masculine privilege. The first written reference to dry shampoo in the United States is from the late 1700s, when starches were used to deodorize and alter the color of wigs. Other early mentions of dry shampoo include foam substances used by barbers to clean hair in the late 1800s.

The first commercially produced dry shampoo was sold in the 1940s. By the early 1940s, the Stephanie Brooke Company of Jersey City, New Jersey, had developed Minipoo, the first brand of commercially produced dry shampoo powder. Minipoo was marketed to women and children for use in such scenarios as "surprise dates" or when they were sick in bed, according to the Smithsonian's National Museum of American History.

== Composition ==
Dry shampoo is generally composed of a carrier agent containing an active powder. Normally, starch is used as the active powder. When the powder is sprayed onto hair, the carrier agent evaporates while the starch remains attached. While the active powder can be replaced with other substances, such as activated carbon and alumina, these substances are generally not used due to their inability to biodegrade. In particular, activated carbon and alumina leave behind a residue that is difficult to remove. Presently [when?], rice (oryza sativa) starch and cetrimonium chloride are the most common starches used in dry shampoos. Dry shampoo in the form of aerosol also often contains a propellant ingredient. The propellant used in dry shampoo usually consists of butane, isobutane, and propane, which makes up 70–90% of the total composition.

Dry shampoos often contain anionic surfactants that do not dissolve in water. The surfactant molecules have a hydrophilic portion as well as a hydrophobic portion to bind with water and oils. Surfactants, such as detergents, rely heavily on micelle formations. Amphiphile molecules organize into small clusters of micelles with the hydrocarbon non-polar ends facing inwards. When dry shampoo is applied, amphiphile molecules surround suspended oil drops which then can be removed. The anionic substances often leave a form of calcium salts, which are not soluble, in the hair strands, causing hair to be dry and tangled. The alkaline residue may also cause hair and skin irritations.

== Types ==
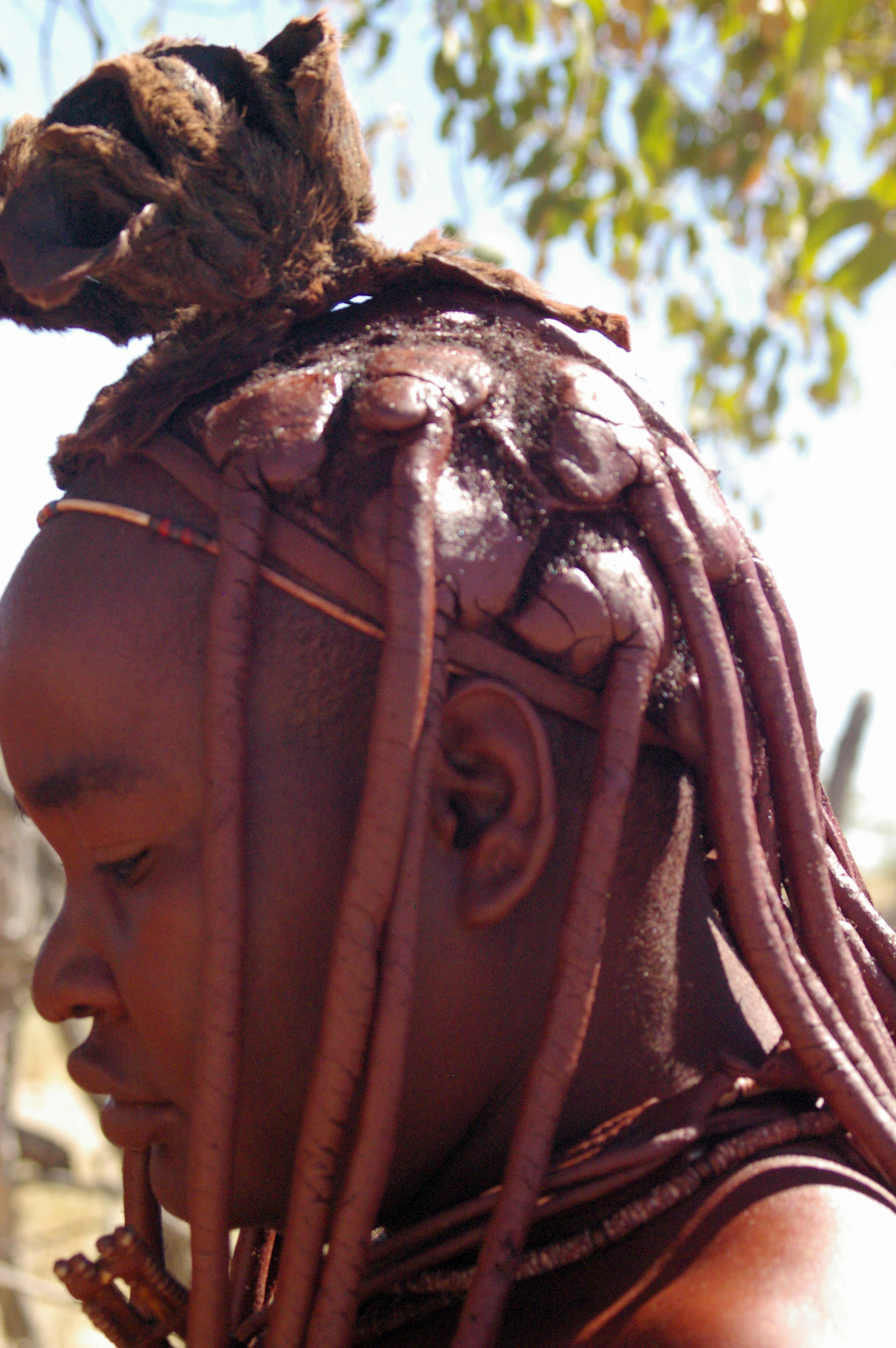
The use of red clay as a form of dry shampoo in the hair of a Himba woman.

Dry shampoo can be administered as a powder, where all the ingredients of dry shampoo are combined together and applied to the scalp with the hand, or through the aerosol form where the dry shampoo is sprayed directly onto the head. In the aerosol form, the powders comprising the dry shampoo are dispersed throughout pressurized gas inside a can; when the release is pressed, the pressurized gas and powders inside are released, forming the aerosol that lands on the head or scalp.

=== Homemade dry shampoo ===
This product has also been made at home, in addition to being purchased in stores. DIY dry shampoos usually have some sort of starch base, which is one of the key products in commercially produced dry shampoos, and often contain essential oils for scent.

=== Herbal powder shampoo ===
Herbal powder shampoos are another form of dry shampoo. As a natural hair-care product, they tend to have fewer negative side effects than traditional mass-market shampoos, and contain a dry powder mixture of aloe vera and other plant byproducts to reduce skin, eye, and scalp irritation from surfactants.

=== Clay ===
Clay has been used throughout history as a form of dry shampoo. Rhassoul clay, also known as red clay, originating in Morocco, is traditionally used as a leave-in shampoo and conditioner. Due to its high absorbance of sebum, clay is often used as a remedy for dandruff and seborrhea. Such properties of clay stem from its colloidal particle size and crystalline structure. Even though clay is generally considered to be a natural, non-toxic material, it should not be stored in metal containers due to its retention of heavy metals.

=== For animals ===
In addition to the liquid shampoos, there are dry shampoos available for pets with fur. The waterless-foaming shampoo is applied directly into the fur of the pet without the need to pre-wet or rinse the pet after application. These shampoos often contain a combination of detergents, antimicrobial agents, and surfactants. Certain conditioners may also contain additional agents, such as Melaleuca oil, for the treatment of fleas. The foaming component of the shampoo comes from a pressurized gas, such as carbon dioxide, mixing with a foaming liquid. Once the foam is applied to the fur, the foam needs to be worked in vigorously before being wiped off.

== Proper application ==
The product is applied to the scalp or roots of the hair, either through aerosol form or by directly applying the powder. The powder in the product is allowed to remain on the hair for an extended period of time, and then the powder is massaged or brushed through the hairs. Allowing the product to sit in the hair before brushing it out allows more time for the product to absorb the sebum oils in the hair, and brushing out the product would reduce the powder's potentially noticeable effect.

- Apply dry shampoo to specific oily areas.
- If using an aerosol dry shampoo, hold the can at least 6 inches away from the application area.
- Once applied, evenly distribute the dry shampoo by either massaging the scalp or brushing through the hair.
- Avoid spraying ends of hair from excessive drying.
- Do not use for more than two days in a row.

== Potential side effects ==
- Hair loss from inflamed hair follicles due to blockage.
- Respiratory toxicity: Talc is often present in dry shampoos as an absorbent which can lead to respiratory issues.
- Allergies: There is often the use of fragrances in dry shampoos which may cause allergies or sensitivities.
- Dermatitis caused by fragrances and potential metals from dry shampoo.
- Nausea caused by liquefied petroleum gas.
- Hormone disruption resulting from the inclusion of parabens as a preservative.
- Eye irritations should the product accidentally be administered to the eye.
- Fungal growth from the build up of chemical powders and pollutants.
- Breakouts (acne) from the blockage of pores from dry shampoo residues.
- Flammable if the product contains butane, isobutane, or propane in the spray propellant.
