= Greasy hair =

Hair condition

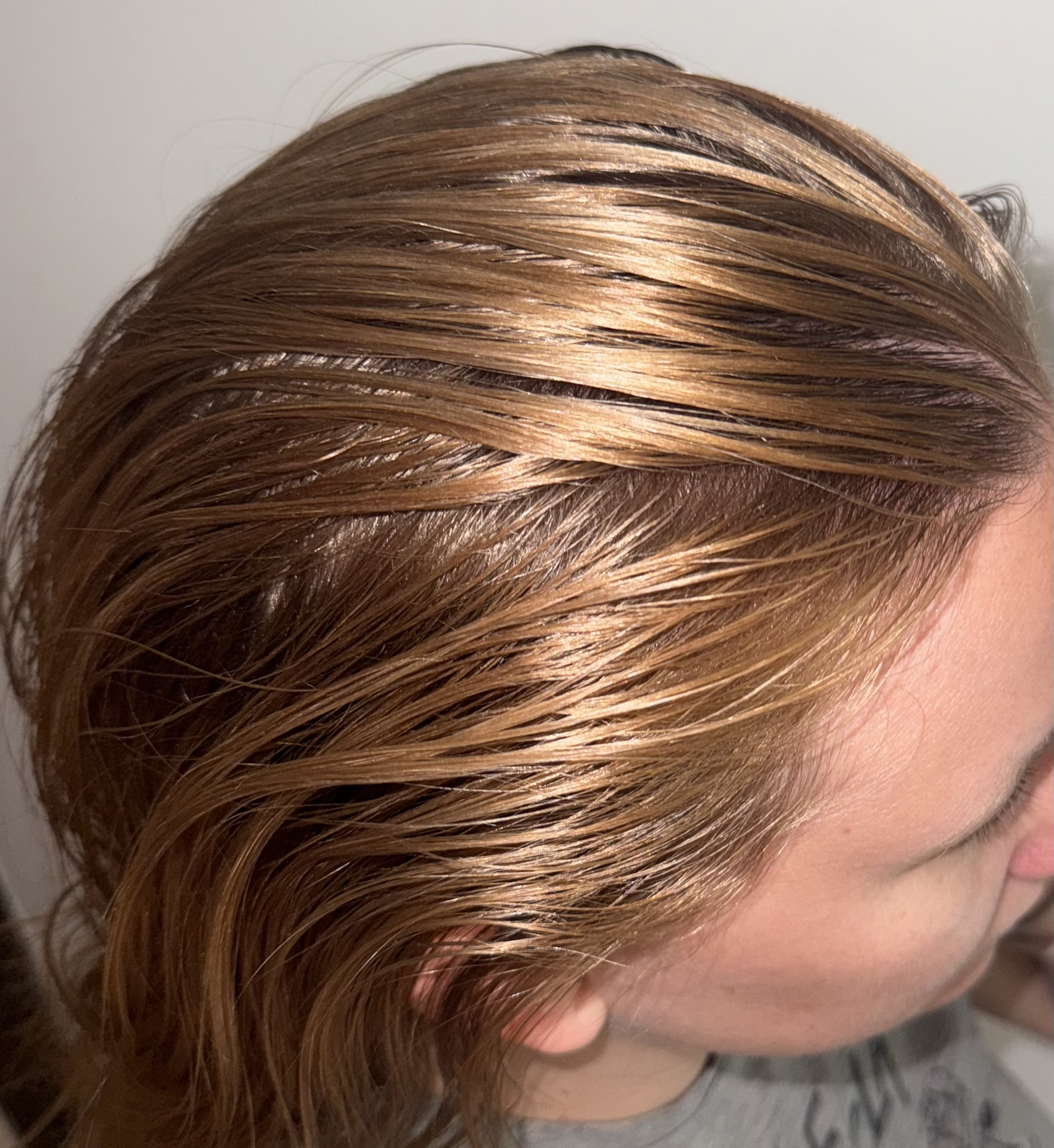
Example of greasy hair

Greasy hair is a hair condition which is common in humans, one of four main types of hair conditioning: normal, greasy, dry and greasy dry. It is primarily caused by build-up of the natural secretion from the sebaceous glands in the scalp and is characterised by the continuous development of natural grease on the scalp. A chronic condition of greasy hair may often accompany chronic greasy skin conditions on the face and body and oily skin and acne. Excessive carbohydrate, fat and starch consumption can increase the likelihood of developing greasy hair and also poor personal hygiene and not washing the hair for a long duration will lead to a buildup of sebum in the hair follicles. Hair conditioners can decrease the likelihood of developing greasy hair after shampooing. Some cosmetics companies produce shampoos and conditioners specifically to deal with greasy hair and for oily or dry hair problems. Massaging the scalp and exposure to the sun can reduce the problem of greasy hair.

In combination with hairstyles such as pompadours and undercuts, a greased back wet hair look is considered desirable. Hair gels and waxes known as pomades are applied to form the hair and give it a greasy texture.
