= Hair washing without commercial shampoo =

Keeping hair clean without commercial shampoo

Hair washing without commercial shampoo, sometimes called no poo, includes water-only hair washing or hair washing with non-shampoo products, such as baking soda or vinegar. Advocates argue that commercial shampoo is an unnecessary expense, creates an artificial cleansing cycle, and may contain harmful ingredients.

== Rationale ==
Synthetic shampoos were introduced in the 1930s. Daily shampooing became the norm in the US in the 1970s and 1980s, but hair washing is determined by cultural norms and individual preferences, with some people washing daily, some fortnightly, and some not at all. From a clinical point of view, "the main purpose for a shampoo is to cleanse the scalp", not to "beautify the hair".

Proponents of hair washing without shampoo believe that commercial products are unnecessary, and therefore an unnecessary expense. Following a 2007 radio interview with Matthew Parris (a Times columnist "who hadn't shampooed for more than a decade"), Australian radio presenter Richard Glover challenged his audience to try going without shampoo for six weeks. 86 percent of more than 500 participants reported that "their hair was either better or the same" following the challenge.

Some proponents argue that by removing the natural oils (sebum) produced by the scalp, commercial shampoo creates a vicious cycle of increased oil production and more frequent hair washing, which can take up to six weeks to break. Other proponents avoid shampoos because they believe some of the ingredients to be harmful. Sulfates like sodium lauryl sulfate can be irritants; sulfate-free shampoos are also marketed based on this concern. There are also pollution concerns with the fungicides in dandruff shampoo.

== Methods ==
The purest form of shampoo avoidance is to use only water to wash hair. Alternatively, the hair can be washed with baking soda, followed by an acidic rinse such as diluted apple vinegar. Essential oils can be used to give the hair a pleasant aroma. Japanese traditional hair cleansing is with seaweed powder.

== See also ==
- Curly Girl Method
- Hair care
- Hygiene hypothesis
