= Sodium lauroamphoacetate =

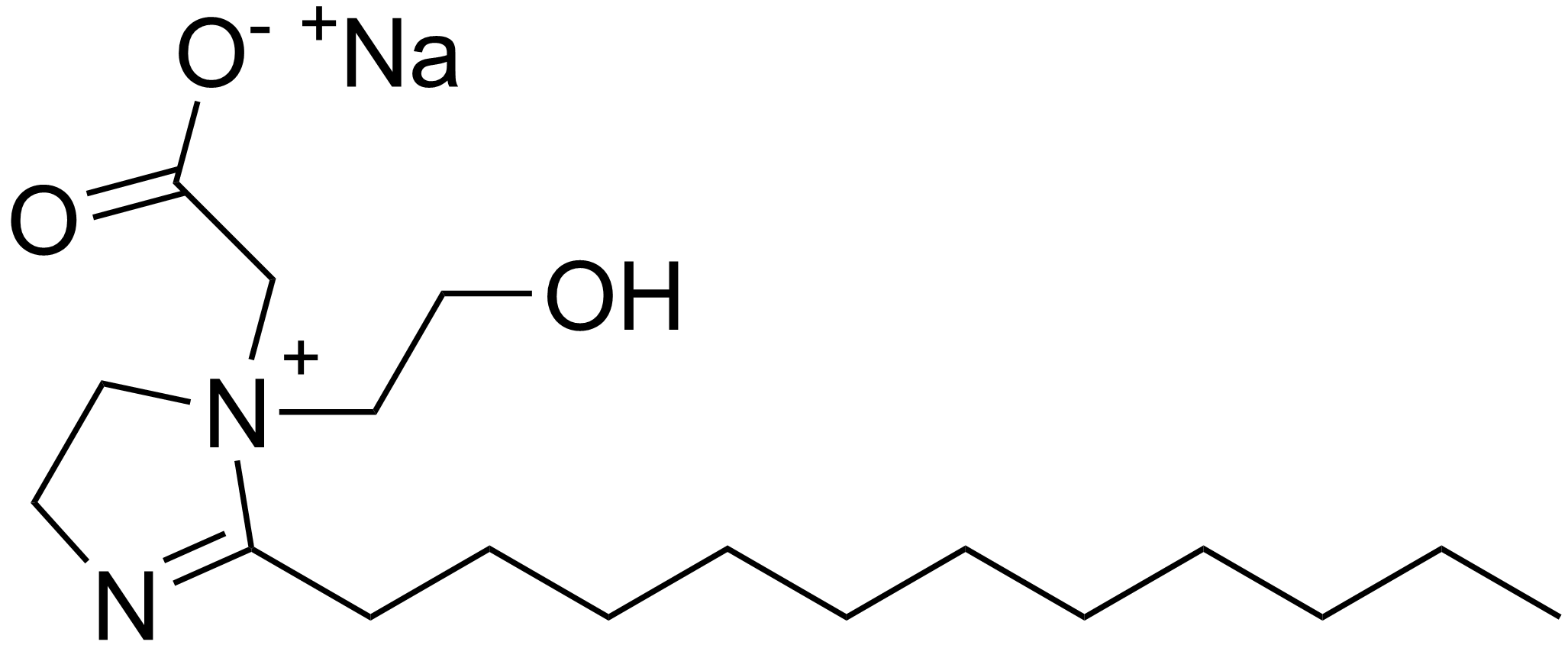

Names
- IUPAC name Sodium 2-[1-(2-hydroxyethyl)-2-undecyl-4,5-dihydroimidazol-1-ium-1-yl]acetate
- Other names Sodium lauroamphocetate; Lauroamphoacetate; Sodium lauramphoacetate; Sodium lauromphoacetate; Sodium lauraamphoacetate; Sodium lauroamphoacetate; Lauroamphoglycinate; Lauroamphoglycinate; Sodium lauroamphoacetate

Identifiers
| CAS Number | 66161-62-4 |
| 3D model (JSmol) | Interactive image |
| ChemSpider | 57539164 |
| PubChem CID | 71308272 |
| UNII | SLK428451L |
| CompTox Dashboard (EPA) | DTXSID40745448 |
- InChI: InChI=1S/C18H34N2O3.Na/c1-2-3-4-5-6-7-8-9-10-11-17-19-12-13-20(17,14-15-21)16-18(22)23;/h21H,2-16H2,1H3;/q;+1 Key: HFQBFCSVHWJVNK-UHFFFAOYSA-N
- SMILES: CCCCCCCCCCCC1=NCC[N+]1(CC([O-])=O)CCO.[Na+]

Properties
| Chemical formula | C_{18}H_{34}N_{2}NaO_{3} |
| Molar mass | 349.471 g·mol^{−1} |
- Except where otherwise noted, data are given for materials in their standard state (at 25 °C [77 °F], 100 kPa). verify (what is ?) Infobox references

Sodium lauroamphoacetate is a zwitterionic surfactant of the amphoacetate class. It is used as a very mild cleaning agent originally used in shampoos and body washes for infants but it now sees broader use in other personal care products.

== Synthesis ==
Sodium lauroamphoacetate is produced in a 2 step process. Firstly lauric acid reacts with aminoethylethanolamine (AEEA); this initially produces the amide however heating causes this to cyclize to give the imidazoline group. This reacts with 1 equivalent of sodium chloroacetate to give the final product. A reaction with 2 equivalents gives the di-acetate, which is also marketed as di-sodium lauroamphoacetate.

== Safety ==
Sodium lauroamphoacetate is exceedingly mild, and cases of skin irritation are rare but not unheard of. It has been proposed that these instances are caused not by sodium lauroamphoacetate itself but rather by failures in quality control which result in it being contaminated with AEEA.
