= Scalp pruritus =

Itching of the scalp

Scalp pruritus is an itchiness of the scalp, particularly common in elderly people. Scalp pruritus is sometimes very unpleasant because itch and pain sensations share common nerve pathways.

== See also ==
- Pruritus
