= Ouidad Wise =

American hairdresser

Ouidad Stephen Wise is an American hairdresser and co-founder of the Ouidad brand, who opened the first salon for curly hair in 1984 in the U S. She runs salons across the United States, Canada, and Curacaos and sells hair care products under the Ouidad brand. Her flagship salons are located in Manhattan, NY, Santa Monica CA and Ft Lauderdale, FL.

== Biography ==
Ouidad was born in Lebanon and emigrated to the U.S. at 16. She is married to Peter Wise, co-founder of Ouidad and her business partner.

Ouidad worked with Unilever brand Sunsilk as a product co-creator for Latin America's curl variant.

In 2004, Ouidad and Peter Wise started Curls For A Cure and partnered with the Breast Cancer Research Foundation by raising money and continuing to match dollar-for-dollar donations.

In 2010, Ouidad was the Hall of Fame Inductee for the Cancer Research & Treatment Fund

She has been a panelist for Cosmetic Executive Women: she received the 2011 CEW Great Idea Award for bringing the curly hair segment to the beauty industry.

Ouidad launched her educational programs to the hair industry in the 90’s with the only trademarked cut (Carving and Slicing®) in the US. As of 2013, Ouidad ‘curls only’ certified salons can be found in 36 cities across the US

== Books ==
Ouidad is the author of two books Curl Talk; Three Rivers Press; Everything You Need to Know to Love and Care for Your Curly, Kinky, Wavy, or Frizzy Hair. (ISBN 978-0609808375), and My Curl World; How an Awesome Team of Immigrants Conquered Prejudice One Curl at a Time (ISBN 979-8645130657)
