= Selenium sulfide =

Selenium sulfide can refer to either of the following:

- Selenium disulfide, SeS_{2}
- Selenium hexasulfide, Se_{2}S_{6}
