= Rhassoul =

Smectite clay-based cosmetic

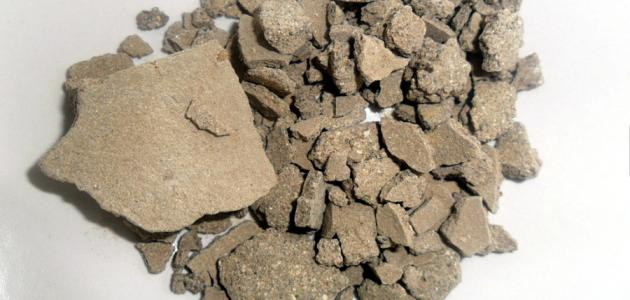
Rhassoul clay

Rhassoul, or ghassoul (Moroccan Arabic: الغاسول, romanized: l-ġasul), is a cosmetic made of natural mineral clay mined from the Atlas Mountains of Morocco. It is mixed with water, sometimes with herbs or other substances, to clean the body. It has been used by Moroccan women on their skin and hair for centuries. Rhassoul contains silica, iron, magnesium, potassium, sodium, lithium and other trace elements.

== Location ==
The rhassoul or ghassoul products come from the only known deposits in the world. These deposits border the Middle Atlas chain, in the Moulouya valley, 200 km from the Moroccan city of Fes.

== Uses ==
The use of rhassoul is believed to date back to the 8th century. Today, rhassoul is mainly used in traditional Moroccan hammams. It is applied as a facial mask, or as a poultice to the body with a glove, or kessa. Its use is similar to a Western-style mud wrap. There is little formal research available on the efficacy of rhassoul.
