= Head massage =

Massage of the scalp or head

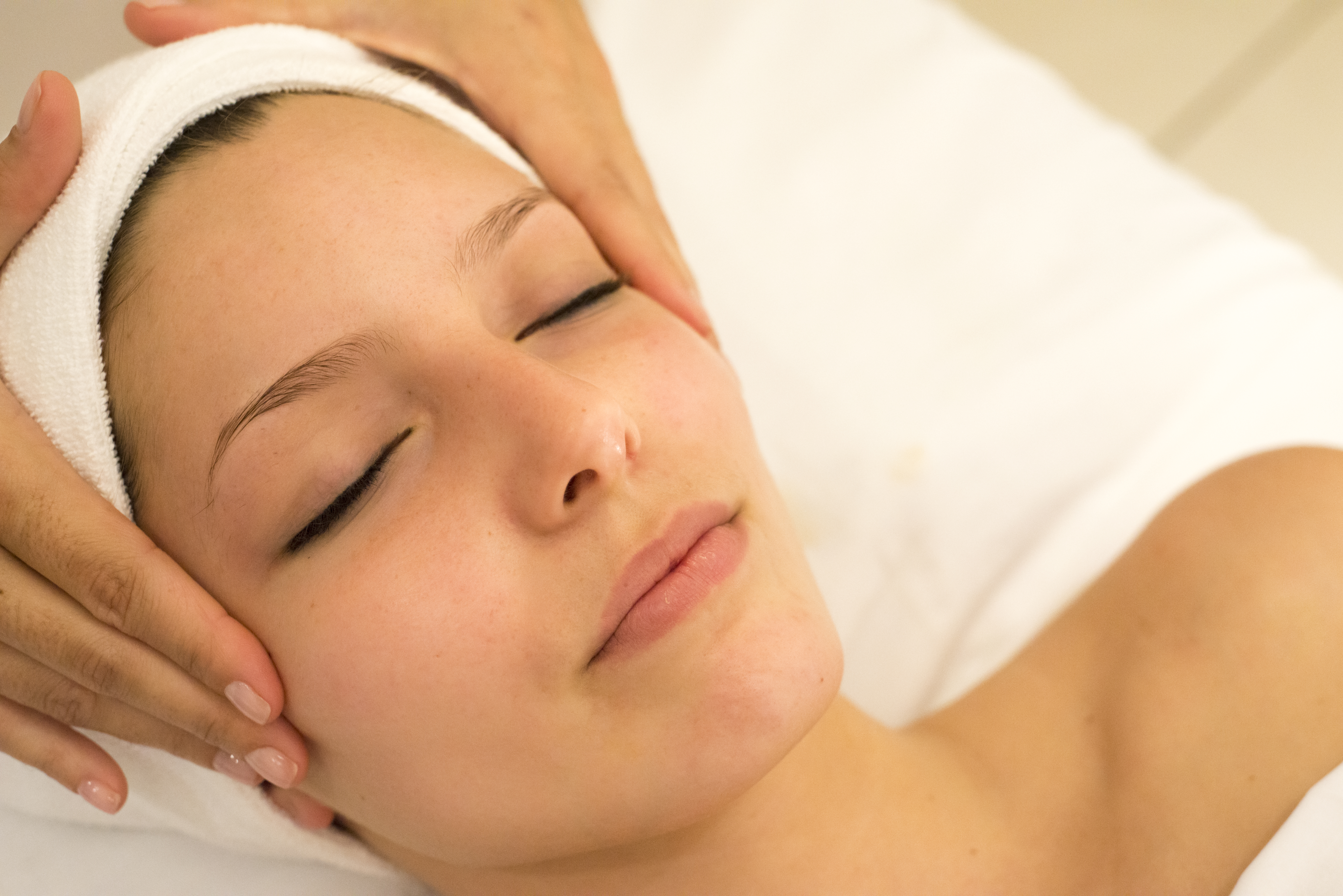
Woman receiving a head massage focused on the temples

Head massage or scalp massage is a form of massage directed towards the scalp or head of the recipient.

== Head massage devices ==
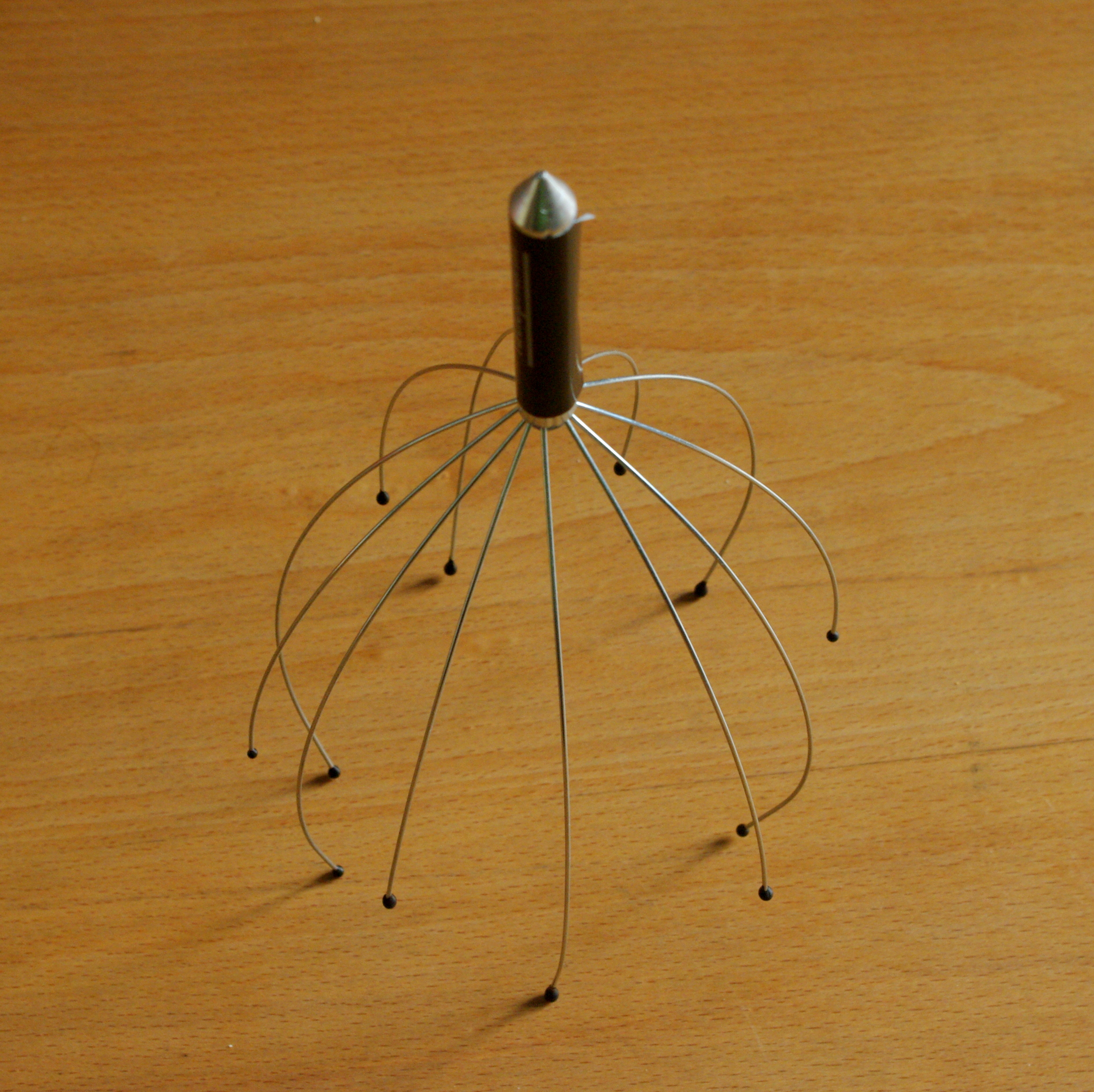
"Orgasmatron" head massage device

One such massage device is the "Orgasmatron", made of partially flexible copper wires attached to a handle and operated manually. It is made by an Australian company of the same name. The device is sold in the United States under the name "Happy's Head Trip". The Orgasmatron was designed by Dwayne Lacey, who registered the design in 1998. Since it was first brought to market, several similar devices appeared, resulting in legal action from Lacey. According to The Guardian, the device induces "a heavenly, tingling sensation".

== Indian head massage ==
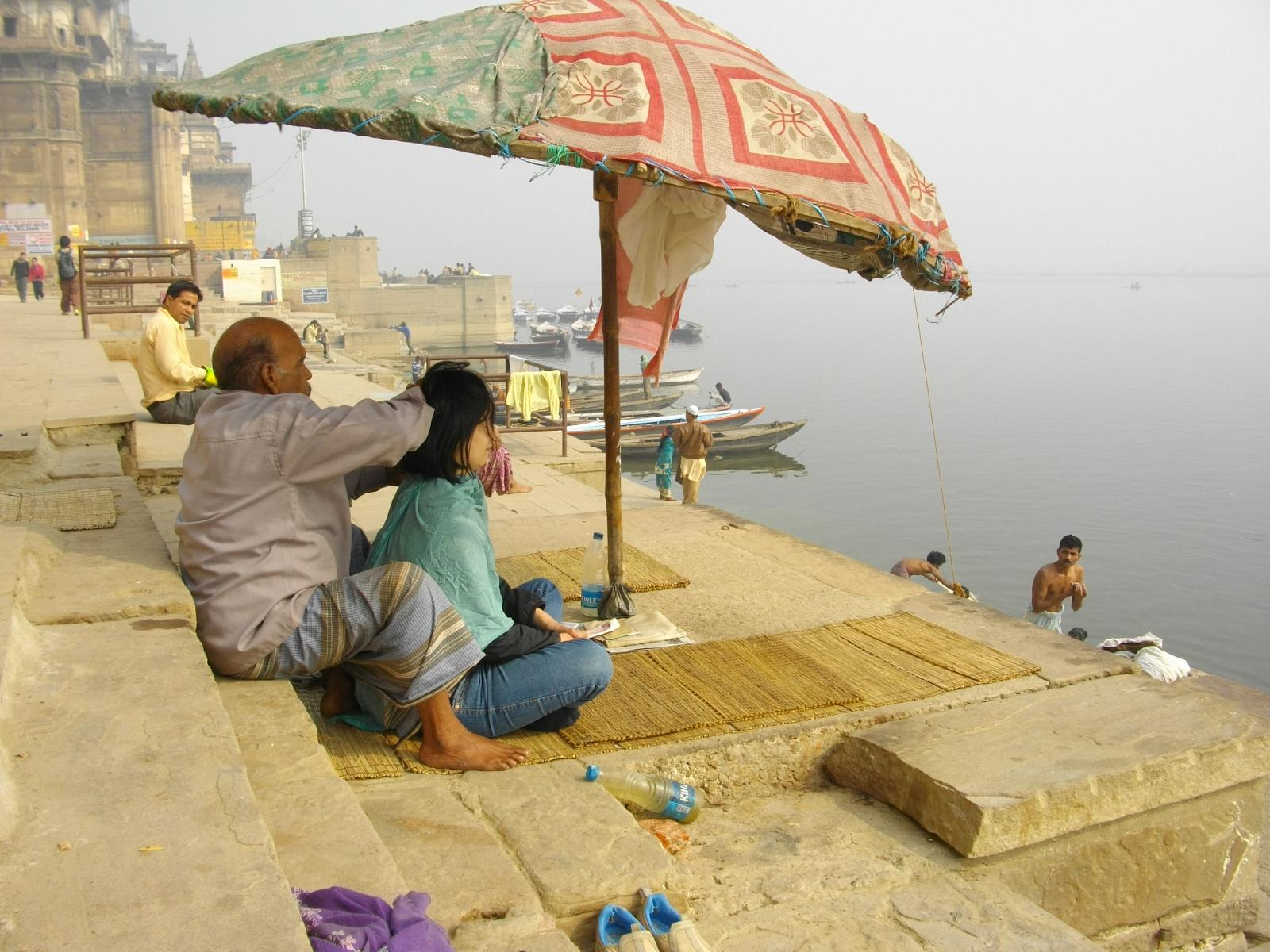
Woman in India receiving a head massage from a public seller of massages

Indian head massage refers to various types of head massages. One form of this is the shampoo (from champi, the Hindi term for the practice and massage). In shampoo, the upper back, shoulders, neck, head and face are massaged.

== See also ==
- Massage chair
