= Hair oil =

Oil applied to the hair

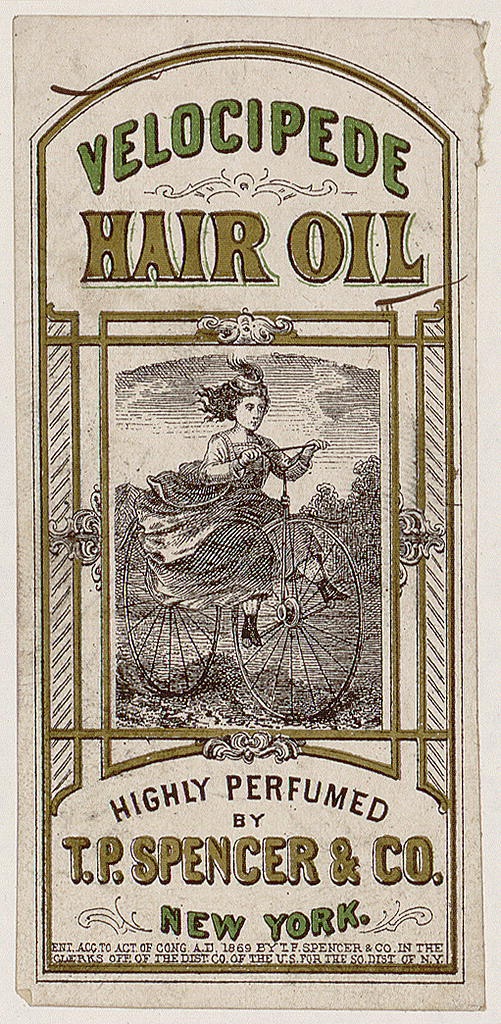
An 1869 product for hair oil

Hair oil is an oil-based cosmetic product intended to improve the condition of hair. Various types of oils may be included in hair oil products. These often purport to aid with hair growth, dryness, or damage.

== History ==
Ancient Egyptians paid special attention to hair and images of hairdressers are depicted in ancient relics found by archaeologists. Archaic texts found during this era had information about recipes used by the Egyptians to tackle baldness. During this time period, people used combs and ointments to groom and style their hair. It is also a popular Ancient Indian technique, it was often used as a predecessor of the modern shampoo.

== Uses ==
Many cosmetic products including shampoo, heat protectants, hair drops, or hair masks contain oils.

Humans produce natural hair oil called sebum from glands around each follicle. Other mammals produce similar oils such as lanolin. Similar to natural oils, artificial hair oils can decrease scalp dryness by forming hydrophobic films that decrease transepidermal water loss, reducing evaporation of water from the skin. Oils on the hair can reduce the absorption of water that damages hair strands through repeated hygral stress as the hair swells when wet, then shrinks as it dries. Oils also protect cuticle cells in the hair follicle and prevent the penetration of substances like surfactants. Saturated and monounsaturated oils diffuse into hair better than polyunsaturated ones. Hair oiling practices have are important to Ayurvedic and Unani cultures and systems of medicine. Benefits were believed to provide many holistic benefits such as stress reduction and prevention of hair aging.

== Oil types ==
Mineral and vegetable oils are used to make a variety of commercial and traditional hair oils. Coconut oil is a common ingredient. Other vegetable sources include almond, argan, babassu, burdock, castor, and camellia (tea) seed.

Natural oils are used more commonly as cosmetic products on the scalp. Natural oils come from natural resources that are very high in nutrients such as vitamins and fatty acids.

=== Coconut oil ===
Coconut oil has properties that reduce protein loss in hair when used before and after wash. Coconut oil is known to have lauric acid, which is a type of fatty acid that may penetrate the hair shaft due to a low molecular weight and linear conformation.

=== Argan oil ===
Argan oil originates from Morocco and is known for a conditioning effect that leaves hair soft and relieves frizz.

=== Avocado oil ===
Avocado oil is rich in nutrients. It has a high concentration of vitamin E, which is an antioxidant that may decrease hair loss and encourages hair growth.

=== Rosemary oil ===
Rosemary oil is very effective in promoting hair growth. Rosemary oil is known to include rosemaric acid, carnosic acid, and 1-8 cineole which are known to be very effective in promoting hair growth. The characteristics of rosemary oil signify that they promote a healthy scalp and should have positive effects. Many clinical studies have been done using rosemary oil to combat hair loss, espeically in instances of alopecia. Insights have shown that implementing rosemary oil as the primary carrier oil have been shown to have effects similar to 2% minoxidil.

=== Other oils ===
Oils including almond oil, grapeseed oil, jojoba oil, olive oil may promote hair elasticity and help prevent dryness and hair damage.

== Pop Culture ==
In today's world, the practice of hair oiling has had a major shift from its traditions as a cultural practice to a marketable product. As a result of trends promoting the benefits of hair oiling, commercial products have been leaning into the implementation of hair oils within their products. These trends are typically promoted within the media using research from the benefits of the oils. Many consumers will find the products to be more reputable due to their promotion of the oils in the product. From a global perspective, hair oiling and associated products are popular due to their alignment with "green beauty" which is consistent with modern day trends.

There is also controversy in the framing of hair oiling trends from a western lens despite Indian roots. In Indian culture, hair oiling is ritualistic and a practice that is sacred to the culture. It is also seen as a bonding practice between mothers and their children. Now in the mainstream, influencer and beauty brands will capitalize on their relationships with their audience in order to promote hair oiling products and techniques, which appear more personal than traditional advertisements that in turn undermine the cultural context of hair oiling practices.

== See also ==
- Beard oil
- Pomade
- Shaving oil
