= Hair care =

Hygiene and cosmetology involving human hair

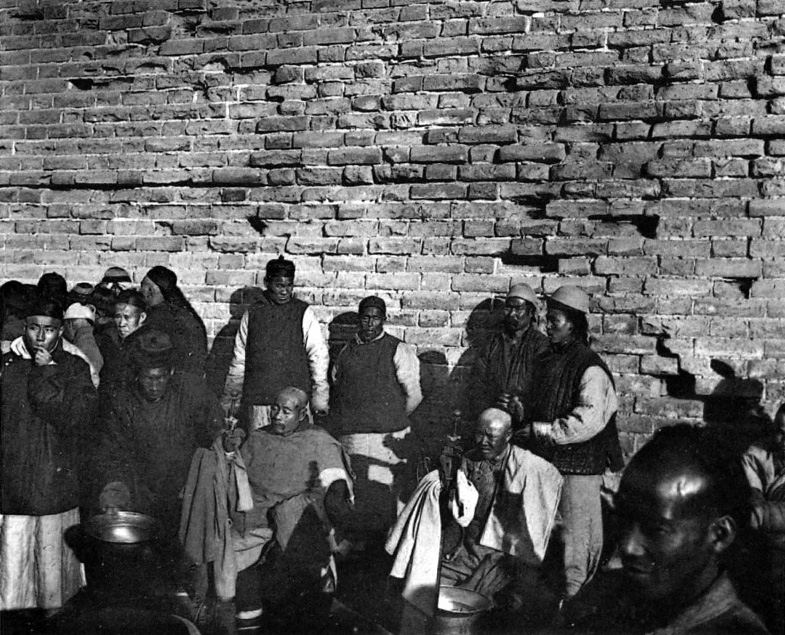
Hair care in Tianjin, China, in late Qing dynasty

Hair care or haircare is an overall term for hygiene and cosmetology involving the hair which grows from the human scalp, and to a lesser extent facial, pubic and other body hair. Hair care routines differ according to an individual's culture and the physical characteristics of one's hair. Hair may be colored, trimmed, shaved, plucked or otherwise removed with treatments such as waxing, sugaring and threading. Hair care services are offered in salons, barbershops and day spas, and products are available commercially for home use. Laser hair removal and electrolysis are also available, though these are provided (in the United States) by licensed professionals in medical offices or specialty spas.

== Hair cleaning and conditioning ==
=== Biological processes and hygiene ===
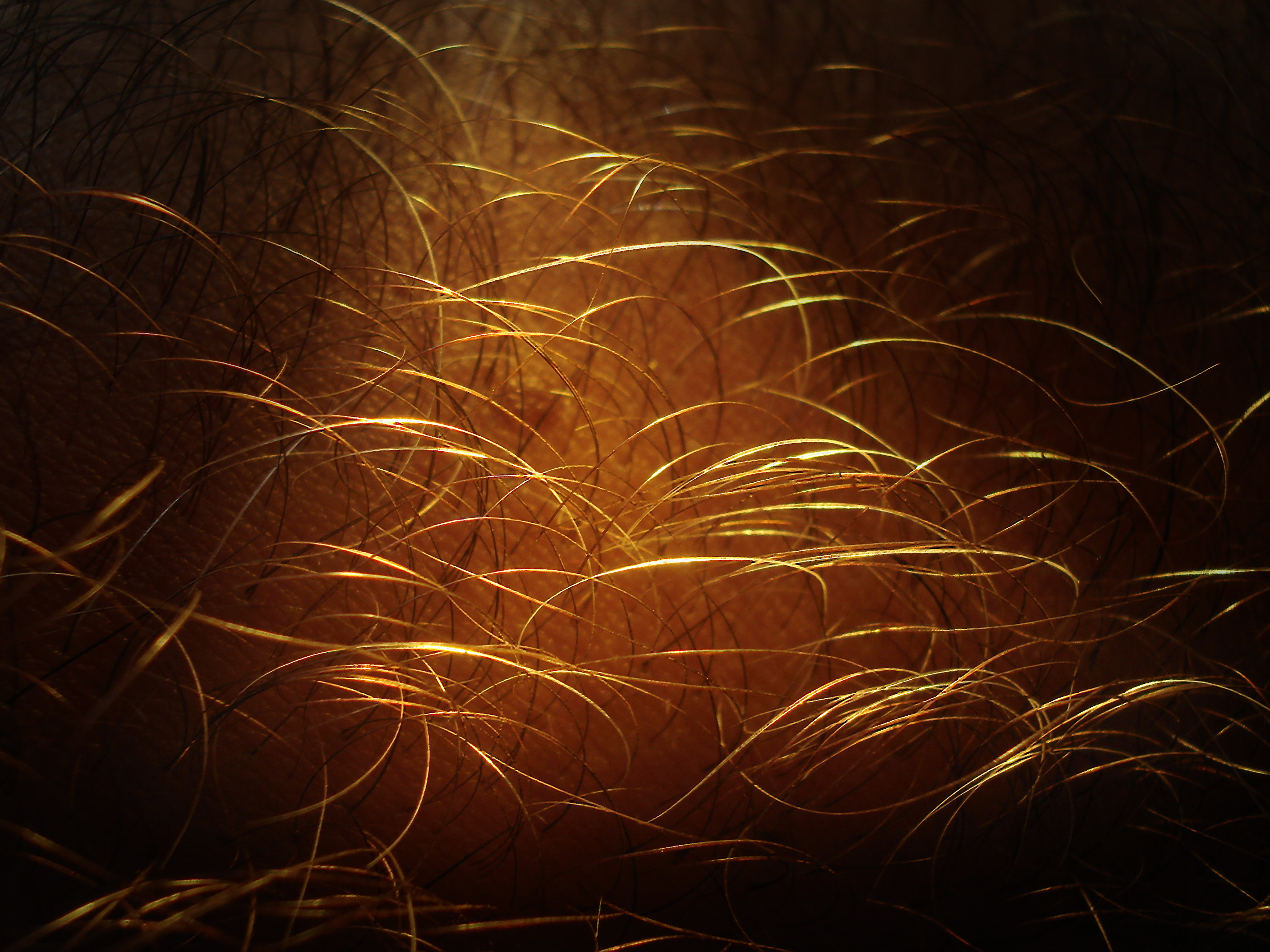
Human hair close-up

Care of the hair and care of the scalp skin may appear separate, but are actually intertwined because hair grows from beneath the skin. The living parts of hair (hair follicle, hair root, root sheath and sebaceous gland) are beneath the skin, while the actual hair shaft which emerges (the cuticle which covers the cortex and medulla) has no living processes. Damage or changes made to the visible hair shaft cannot be repaired by a biological process, though much can be done to manage hair and ensure that the cuticle remains intact.

Scalp skin, just like any other skin on the body, must be kept healthy to ensure a healthy body and healthy hair production. If the scalp is cleaned regularly by those who have rough hair or have a hair-fall problem, it can result in loss of hair. However, not all scalp disorders are a result of bacterial infections. Some arise inexplicably, and often only the symptoms can be treated for management of the condition (example: dandruff). There are also bacteria that can affect the hair itself. Head lice is probably the most common hair and scalp ailment worldwide. Head lice can be removed with great attention to detail, and studies show it is not necessarily associated with poor hygiene. More recent studies reveal that head lice actually thrive in clean hair. In this way, hair washing as a term may be a bit misleading, as what is necessary in healthy hair production and maintenance is often simply cleaning the surface of the scalp skin, the way the skin all over the body requires cleaning for good hygiene.

The sebaceous glands in human skin produce sebum, which is composed primarily of fatty acids. Sebum acts to protect hair and skin, and can inhibit the growth of microorganisms on the skin. Sebum contributes to the skin's slightly acidic natural pH somewhere between 5 and 6.8 on the pH spectrum. This oily substance gives hair moisture and shine as it travels naturally down the hair shaft, and serves as a protective substance by preventing the hair from drying out or absorbing excessive amounts of external substances. Even though sebum serves as a protective substance, too much of this oily substance can cause blockage around hair follicles. This blockage is usually from dandruff or even dead skin. As a result, "blocked or obstructed hair follicles" may prevent hair from producing. Sebum is also distributed down the hair shaft "mechanically" by brushing and combing. When sebum is present in excess, the roots of the hair can appear oily, greasy, and darker than normal, and the hair may stick together.

=== Hair cleaning ===
Washing hair removes excess sweat and oil, as well as unwanted products from the hair and scalp. Often hair is washed as part of a shower or bathing with shampoo, a specialized surfactant. Shampoos work by applying water and shampoo to the hair. The specific shampoo for oily or dry hair breaks the surface tension of the water, allowing the hair to become soaked. This is known as the wetting action. The wetting action is caused by the head of the shampoo molecule attracting the water to the hair shaft. Conversely, the tail of the shampoo molecule is attracted to the grease, dirt and oil on the hair shaft. The physical action of shampooing makes the grease and dirt become an emulsion that is then rinsed away with the water. This is known as the emulsifying action. Sulfate free shampoos are less harming on color treated hair than normal shampoos that contain sulfates. Sulfates strip away natural oils as well as hair dye. Sulfates are also responsible for the foaming effect of shampoos. Shampoos have a pH of between 4 & 6. Acidic shampoos are the most common type used and maintain or improve the condition of the hair as they do not swell the hairshaft and do not strip the natural oils.

== Hairstyling tools ==
=== Hairstyling equipment ===
Hairstyling equipment which helps in creating hairstyles include:

- Hair dryer
- Hair clip
- Comb
- Hair iron
- Hair roller
- Hair clipper
- Hairbrush
- Hairpin
- Headband
- Kanzashi
- Ribbon
- Hair tie
- Scissors
- Shower cap

=== Hair products ===
The role of the microbiome in hair care is very important. There are both challenges and opportunities in meeting global regulatory standards. There are various models and methods for assessing the safety of hair care products within a global context. There is an emphasize on the journey of these products from laboratory testing to market. To make sure that the products are handled with care there are clinical and preclinical assessments in line with global regulations. The use of ex-vivo hair follicle models ensure product safety and efficacy to add an additional form of security within the product.

Cosmetics products used in creating and maintaining hairstyles include:

- Hair coloring
- Hair conditioner
- Hair gel
- Hair glue
- Hair mousse
- Hair serum
- Hair spray
- Hair tonic
- Hair wax
- Pomade

== Hair lengths ==
- Bald – having no hair at all on the head
- Shaved – hair that is completely shaved down to the scalp
- Buzz – hair that is extremely short and hardly there
- Cropped – hair that is a little longer than a buzz
- Short back and sides – hair that is longer than a crop, but does not yet hit the ears
- Ear-length – hair reaching one's ears
- Chin-level – hair that grows down to the chin
- Flip-level – hair reaching the neck or shoulders
- Shoulder-length – hair reaching the shoulders
- Armpit-length – hair reaching the armpit
- Midback-level – hair that's at about the same point as the widest part of one's ribcage and chest area
- Waist-length – hair that falls at the smallest part of one's waist, a little bit above the hip bones
- Hip-length – hair reaching the top of one's hips
- Tailbone-length – hair that is at about the area of one's tailbone
- Classic length – hair that reaches where one's legs meet the buttocks
- Thigh-length – hair that is at the mid-thigh
- Knee-length – hair that is at the knee
- Calf-length – hair that is at the calf
- Floor-length – hair that reaches the floor

== Chemical alteration ==
Chemical alterations like perming, coloring can be carried out to change the perceived color and texture of hair. All of these are temporary alterations because permanent alterations are not possible at this time.

Chemical alteration of hair only affects the hair above the scalp; unless the hair roots are damaged, new hair will grow in with natural color and texture.

=== Hair coloring ===
Hair coloring is the process of adding pigment to or removing pigment from the hair shaft. Hair coloring processes may be referred to as coloring or bleaching, depending on whether pigment is being added or removed.

Temporary hair tints simply coat the shaft with pigments which later wash off.

Most permanent color changes require that the cuticle of the hair be opened so the color change can take place within the cuticle. This process, which uses chemicals to alter the structure of the hair, can damage the cuticle or internal structure of the hair, leaving it dry, weak, or prone to breakage. After the hair processing, the cuticle may not fully close, which results in coarse hair or an accelerated loss of pigment. Generally, the lighter the chosen color from one's initial hair color, the more damaged it may be. Other options for applying color to hair besides chemical dyes include the use of such herbs as henna and indigo, or choosing ammonia-free solutions.

The growing preference for natural and non-toxic hair dyes has led to increased demand for green products. Various natural pigments, like melanin in animals and curcumin in plants, are used for coloring and dyeing. These bio-friendly and less irritating nature-inspired dyes are seen as potential alternatives to conventional hair dyes. Despite the proposed benefits of these dyes, such as antistatic, antioxidant, and antibacterial properties, their complex pigmentation mechanisms remain largely unexplored. There several nature inspired products that are used to create healthier hair dying products.

=== Perms and chemical straightening ===
Perms and relaxation using relaxer or thermal reconditioning involve chemical alteration of the internal structure of the hair in order to affect its curliness or straightness. Hair that has been subjected to the use of a permanent is weaker due to the application of chemicals, and should be treated gently and with greater care than hair that isn't chemically altered.

== Special considerations for hair types ==
=== Long hair ===
Many industries have requirements for hair being contained to prevent worker injury. This can include people working in construction, utilities, and machine shops of various sorts. Furthermore, many professions require containing the hair for reasons of public health, and a prime example is the food industry. There are also sports that may require similar constraints for safety reasons: to keep hair out of the eyes and blocking one's view, and to prevent being caught in sports equipment or trees and shrubs, or matted hair in severe weather conditions or water. Safety is usually the reason behind not allowing hair to fly loose on the backs of motorcycles and open-topped sports cars for longer tresses.

=== Delicate skin ===
Scalp skin of babies and the elderly are similar in subdued sebaceous gland production, due to hormonal levels. The sebaceous gland secretes sebum, a waxy ester, which maintains the acid mantle of the scalp and provides a coating that keeps skin supple and moist. The sebum builds overly, between every 2–3 days for the average adult. Those with delicate skin may experience a longer interval. Teenagers often require daily washing of the hair. Sebum also imparts a protective coating to hair strands. Daily washing will remove the sebum daily and incite an increase in sebum production, because the skin notices the scalp skin is lacking sufficient moisture. In cases of scalp disorders, however, this may not be the case. For babies and elderly, the sebaceous gland production is not at peak, thus daily washing is not typically needed.

== Treatment of damage ==
=== Split ends ===
Split ends, known formally as trichoptilosis, happen when the protective cuticle has been stripped away from the ends of hair fibers.

This condition involves a longitudinal splitting of the hair fiber. Any chemical or physical trauma, such as heat, that weathers the hair may eventually lead to split ends. Typically, the damaged hair fiber splits into two or three strands and the split may be two to three centimeters in length. Split ends are most often observed in long hair but also occur in short hair that is not in good condition.

As hair grows, the natural protective oils of the scalp can fail to reach the ends of the hair. The ends are considered old once they reach about 10 centimeters since they have had long exposure to the sun, gone through many shampoos and may have been overheated by hair dryers and hot irons. This all results in dry, brittle ends which are prone to splitting. Infrequent trims and lack of hydrating treatments can intensify this condition.

=== Breakage and other damage ===
Hair can be damaged by chemical exposure, prolonged or repeated heat exposure (as through the use of heat styling tools), and by perming and straightening. Oil is harmful for rough hair and for dry scalp as it decreases nourishment for hair leading to split and hair fall. When hair behaves in an unusual way, or a scalp skin disorder arises, it is often necessary to visit not only a qualified physician, but sometimes a dermatologist, or a trichologist. Conditions that require this type of professional help include, but are not limited to, forms of alopecia, hair pulling/picking, hair that sticks straight out, black dots on the hair, and rashes or burns resulting from chemical processes. Gel provides a shiny look but dries the hair and makes it rough.

There are a number of disorders that are particular to the scalp. Symptoms may include:

- Abnormal odor
- Bleeding
- Bumps
- Caking skin buildup that appears white or another color than one's natural skin tone
- Chafes
- Clumps of hair falling out
- Clumpy flakes that do not easily slough off the scalp skin
- Dandruff and clumps
- Dry hair & scalp
- Excessive itchiness that doesn't go away with a few hair wash, redness of scalp skin
- Patches of thinning
- Pus-like drainage
- Shedding

Any of these symptoms may indicate a need for professional assistance from a dermatologist or trichologist for diagnosis.

Scalp skin can suffer from infestations of mites, lice, infections of the follicles or fungus. There could be allergic reactions to ingredients in chemical preparations applied to the hair, even ingredients from shampoo or conditioners. Common concerns surrounding dandruff (often associated with excessive sebum); psoriasis, eczema, or seborrheic dermatitis.

An odor that persists for a few weeks despite regular hair washing may be an indication of a health problem on the scalp skin.

Not all flakes are dandruff. For example, some can merely be product buildup on the scalp skin. This could result from the common practice of applying conditioner to scalp skin without washing. This would dry upon the scalp skin and flake off, appearing like dandruff and even causing itchiness, but have no health effects whatsoever.

There are various reasons for hair loss, most commonly hormonal issues. Fluctuations in hormones will often show in the hair. Not all hair loss is related to what is known as male pattern baldness, women can suffer from baldness just as men do. Formulas for addressing this specific cause of lack of hair growth yet typically they require around three months of consistent use for results to begin to appear. Cessation may also mean that gained growth may dissipate.

Particularly among women, thyroid disease is one of the more under-diagnosed health concerns. Hair falling out in clumps is one symptom of a set of symptoms that may indicate a thyroid concern. In many gynecological exams a blood screen for thyroid is now a common protocol. Thyroid often shows up first in the behavior of the hair.

During pregnancy and breast feeding, the normal and natural shedding process is typically suspended (starting around month three because it takes a while for the body to recognize and reset for the hormonal shifts the body goes through) for the period of gestation and extended longer if one breast feeds (this includes pumping for breast milk). Upon cessation of either of these, it typically takes around two months for the hormones to shift again to the normal hormonal settings, and hair shedding can increase exponentially, for approximately 3–6 months until hair returns to its normal volume. It is commonly noticed that hair seems thicker and shinier, even, during pregnancy and breast feeding in response to the influx of shifting hormones. It is not unusual also for hair color to change, or hair structure to change (e.g., straighter hair, curlier hair). These changes can occur more often than people may realize yet isn't often reported.

=== General hair loss ===
Some choose to shave their hair off entirely, while others may have an illness (such as a form of cancer—note that not every form of cancer or cancer treatment necessarily means one will lose their hair) that caused hair loss or led to a decision to shave the head.

=== Hair care and nutrition ===
Genetics and health are factors in healthy hair. Proper nutrition is important for hair health. The living part of hair is under the scalp skin where the hair root is housed in the hair follicle. The entire follicle and root are fed by a supply of arteries, and blood carries nutrients to the follicle/root. Any time an individual has any kind of health concern from stress, trauma, medications of various sorts, chronic medical conditions or medical conditions that come and then wane, heavy metals in waters and food, smoking etc. these and more can affect the hair, its growth, and its appearance.

Generally, eating a full diet that contains protein, fruits, vegetables, fat, and carbohydrates is important (several vitamins and minerals require fat in order to be delivered or absorbed by the body). Any deficiency will typically show first in the hair. A mild case of anemia can cause shedding and hair loss. Among others, the B group of vitamins are the most important for healthy hair, especially biotin. B_{5} (pantothenic acid) gives hair flexibility, strength and shine and helps prevent hair loss and graying. B6 helps prevent dandruff and can be found in cereals, egg yolk and liver. Vitamin B_{12} helps prevent the loss of hair and can be found in fish, eggs, chicken and milk.

When the body is under strain, it reprioritizes its processes. For example, the vital organs will be attended to first, meaning that healthy, oxygenated blood may not feed into the hair follicle, resulting in less healthy hair or a decline in growth rate. While not all hair growth issues stem from malnutrition, it is a valuable symptom in diagnosis.

Scalp hair grows, on average, at a rate of about 1.25 centimeters per month, and shampoos or vitamins have not been shown to noticeably change this rate. Hair growth rate also depends upon what phase in the cycle of hair growth one is actually in; there are three phases. The speed of hair growth varies based upon genetics, gender, age, hormones, and may be reduced by nutrient deficiency (i.e., anorexia, anemia, zinc deficiency) and hormonal fluctuations (i.e., menopause, polycystic ovaries, thyroid disease).

The essential omega-3 fatty acids, protein, vitamin B_{12}, and iron, found in fish sources, prevent a dry scalp and dull hair color. Dark green vegetables contain high amounts of vitamins A and C, which help with production of sebum and provide a natural hair conditioner. Legumes provide protein to promote hair growth and also contain iron, zinc, and biotin. Biotin functions to activate certain enzymes that aid in metabolism of carbon dioxide as well as protein, fats, and carbohydrates. A deficiency in biotin intake can cause brittle hair and can lead to hair loss. In order to avoid a deficiency, individuals can find sources of biotin in cereal-grain products, liver, egg yolk, soy flour, and yeast. Nuts contain high sources of selenium and therefore are important for a healthy scalp. Alpha-linolenic acid and zinc are also found in some nuts and help condition the hair and prevent hair shedding that can be caused by a lack of zinc. Protein deficiencies or low-quality protein can produce weak and brittle hair, and can eventually result in loss of hair color. Dairy products are good sources of calcium, a key component for hair growth. A balanced diet is extremely necessary for a healthy scalp and furthermore healthy hair.

== See also ==
- Artificial hair integrations
- Hair coloring
- Hair conditioner
- Hair gel
- Hair mousse
- Hair prosthesis
- Hair transplantation
- Hair washing
- No poo
