= Haworth Press =

American publisher

- Status: acquired
- Founded: 1978
- Founder: Bill Cohen, Patrick McLoughlin
- Successor: Routledge, Informa Healthcare
- Country of origin: United States
- Headquarters location: Philadelphia, Pennsylvania
- Distribution: Worldwide
- Publication types: Professional books; academic journals
- Nonfiction topics: non-fiction

Haworth Press was a publisher of scholarly, academic and trade books, and approximately 200 peer-reviewed academic journals. It was founded in 1978 by the publishing industry executives Bill Cohen and Patrick Mcloughlin. The name was taken from the township of Haworth in England, the home of the Brontë sisters. Many of the Haworth publications cover very specialized material, ranging from mental health, occupational therapy, psychology, psychiatry, addiction studies, social work, interdisciplinary social sciences, library & information science, LGBT studies, agriculture, pharmaceutical science, health care, medicine, and other fields.

== History ==
Their first publication was Library Security Newsletter. Their early publications were all in the fields of library and information science and in social work. As of 2006, they expected to publish over 230 periodicals and over 100 books.

In 2003, the Press developed a publishing program in popular culture, under the direction of Marshall Fishwick of Virginia Tech.

In 2005, Haworth Press began using Pain Exhibit art on the cover of their Journal of Pain and Palliative Care Pharmacotherapy. Art from the Pain Exhibit, which is an educational and visual arts exhibit, has been used on the cover of JPPCP from 2005 to 2009.

In the same year, conservative website WorldNetDaily published a piece denouncing an article titled Pederasty: an integration of empirical, historical, sociological, Cross-Cultural, Cross-species, and evolutionary Perspectives, which was authored by Bruce Rind and set to be published in a special issue of then Haworth Press's Journal of Homosexuality. The managing director of WorldNetDaily, David Kupelian, accused Rind of advocating for pederasty and pointed to his previous research to say that advocacy for sex between adults and minors would be the next step for the "sexual liberation" movement. Ultimately, the pressure arising from Kupelian's website culminated with the cancellation of the article's publication by Haworth Press in the same year.

In 2007, Haworth began the archiving of its journal content on the Portico service That same year, Haworth Press was acquired by the Taylor & Francis Group and became part of Routledge and Informa Healthcare. Bill Cohen, the publisher of Haworth Press, said the merge was motivated by the need for improved computer interface, for "digital permanency", and for increased access to consortial deals.

== Harrington Park Press re-launch ==
Taylor & Francis acquired the non-fiction book titles from the imprint Harrington Park Press, but trademark rights to publish under that imprint in the future were retained by founder Bill Cohen. Harrington Park Press was re-launched in 2010 by Bill Cohen as an independent print/ebook scholarly book publisher distributed by Columbia University Press with an emphasis on LGBTQ topics.
