= Gender discrimination in the medical professions =

Gender discrimination against female clinicians within the health profession

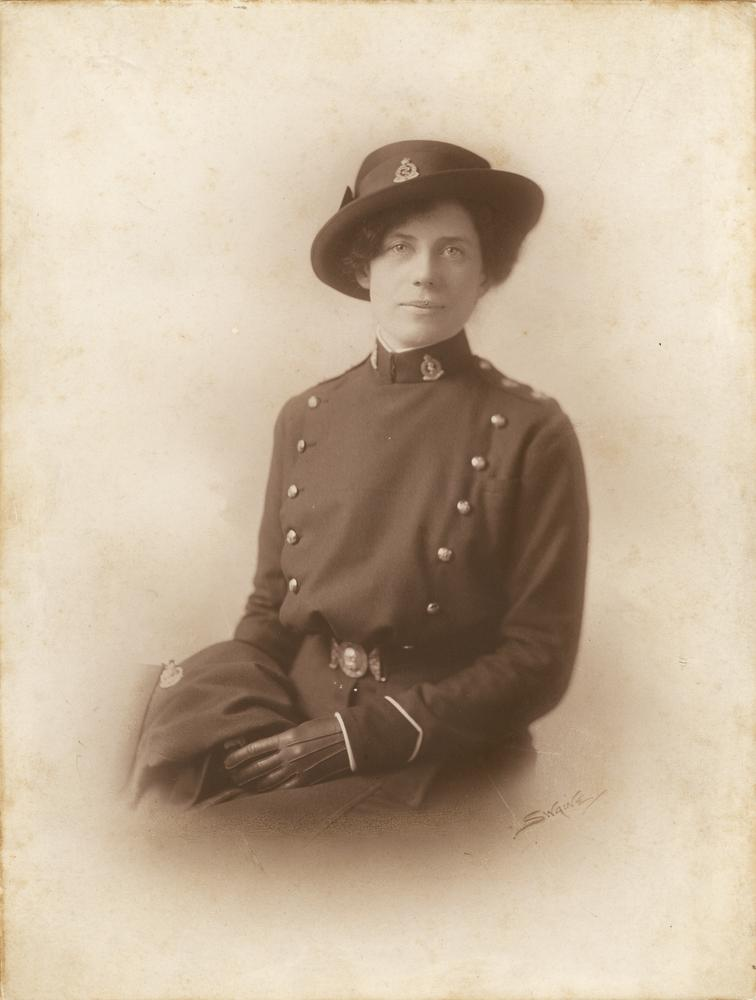
Phoebe Chapple, the first female doctor to win the Military Medal

Gender discrimination in health professions refers to the entire culture of bias against female clinicians, expressed verbally through derogatory and aggressive comments, lower pay and other forms of discriminatory actions from predominantly male peers. These women face difficulties in their work environment as a result of a largely male dominated positions of power within the medical field as well as initial biases presented in the hiring process, but not limited to promotions.

Men who are nurses are often subjected to stereotypic treatment as a result of being in a largely female dominated field. These stereotypes include patients assuming sexual orientation, job title, or not feeling comfortable with a male nurse.

== Medical education ==
Women are underrepresented in leadership positions in academic medicine. Women and men begin their medical careers at similar rates but they do not advance at the same rate. Studies indicate a systematic bias that has resulted in relatively fewer appointments to academic chairs. 32% of associate professors at medical schools are women, 20% of full professors are women, 14% of department chairs are women, and 11% of deans of medical schools are women.

A factor that impedes women's opportunities for advancement in academic medicine is a "stereotype-based cognitive bias". There are two forms of this. The first type is related to clear personal beliefs about women, such as believing that women are less committed to their careers than men and believing that women are worse leaders than men. The second type is implicit bias, which is harder to see because the biases are harder to see, but they still influence one's judgment and actions towards women. Although implicit gender bias still plays a role, explicit bias in academic medicine has significantly decreased during the past half century in the United States as a result of Title IX getting passed. Implicit bias has had little to no improvement. Cultural stereotypes characterize women as "communal", such as kind, dependent, and nurturing, but characterize women as lacking "agentic" traits, such as logical, independent, and strong, which are typically used as a male stereotype. These stereotypes make it difficult for women to achieve in the workforce, specifically in medicine, science, and in leadership. While men are associated with "agentic" traits and women are not, this can lead to women feeling that their work is less valued and they typically receive fewer nominations for opportunities that can advance their career. It has also been found that gender stereotypes play a role in socializing students towards their specialties. For example, women are more likely to go into communal specialties, including family medicine, pediatrics, and internal medicine, while men are more likely to go into surgery, research, and be the chair of a position. If women to go into specialties dominated by males, they typically have lower statuses. Residency is the first time the medical students, or new physicians, get to be in a leadership role. Men who are too communal can be accused of being "wimpy" or "soft" whereas women who are too agentic can be accused of being "bossy" or "domineering".

These stereotypes are due to the lack of gender awareness and role models. Female medical students have reported sexual harassment and discrimination. This is of concern because these obstacles affect "the professional identity formation and specialty choice". Personality differences exist between male and female surgical students. Fewer women choose to specialize in surgery. The lack of female role models may discourage some from choosing a surgical career.

A study by the National Medical Foundation found that 60% of women have reported that gender has had an effect on their educational experience whereas only 25% of males have reported that gender has had an effect on their educational experience. Women said they felt as though they had to be twice as good to be treated equal to men. Additionally, 30.7% of women reported overcoming fear and failure whereas only 19.4% of males reported overcoming fear and failure in education

One response to bias against women academics has been to conduct training for faculty and students to recognize bias and change their habits. The study used professional development, counseling psychology, adult learning, and health behavioral change to development a bias-learning training where data showed that gender biases and habits were not permanent and that they could be shaped and changed.

There is also a persisting class and race gap that is being ignored by contemporary feminist debate, as the discussion about feminism in the medical profession tends to place "too much focus on the opportunities afforded to educated middle class women", most of them white.

Most medical textbooks and other educational materials show a strong bias toward male bodies, especially in images, where most images not specific to the urogenital system or breasts appear to depict men. Some depictions of women in these images are sexualized in their presentation; one 1971 textbook was withdrawn due to controversy because while 77% of the images depicted women, these images were often presented in a pornographic manner similar to pin-up models, while images depicting men tended to crop out the face and genitalia and focus on the body parts being described. Descriptions of the clitoris and the female perineum tend to be brief and in subordinating comparison to their male homologs, the penis and the male perineum. According to David C. Page at the Cedars-Sinai Medical Center, this results in equipment, such as hip replacements, that are exclusively designed for male patients; and research studies that exclusively use male patients or animal models.

== Female clinicians ==
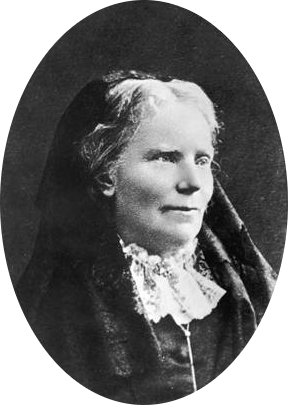
Elizabeth Blackwell was the first woman to graduate from a western medical school

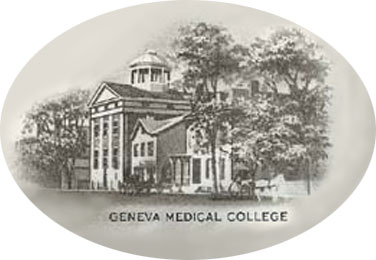
Geneva Medical College, where Elizabeth Blackwell graduated in 1849

While both men and women are enrolling in medical school at similar rates, in 2015 the United States reported having 34% active female physicians and 66% active male physicians. The lower rates of practicing female physicians is associated with their higher rates of experiencing: sexual assault, wage disparities, gender norms, sexism, and medical school sabotage.

Sexual assault

According to a Medscape survey, more than 10% of female physicians have experienced workplace sexual assault compared to 4% of men. Among women who have experienced sexual assault and harassment, 50% stated that this experience negatively impacted their career advancement. Sexual harassment is common amongst younger clinicians when they come in contact with male clinicians in power who have more seniority over them. Due to their sense of power over their coworkers and employees, they feel empowered to commit acts of sexual assault. In many cases, female survivors of sexual assault fail to come forward and report these crimes because they are labeled "troublemakers" and have a hard time finding new employment. As a result of this, and Human Relations typically functioning to protect the company/hospital rather than the survivor, female physician survivors are unlikely to report their experiences, resulting in future female physicians also remaining silent if abused, thus continue the cyclical cycle of misconduct within the medical system.

Wage gap

Female surgeons are also subject to the wage gap. Females were reported to have lower salaries than male surgeons. In a study conducted in 1990, male clinicians were making a mean earnings of $155,400, while female clinicians were making a mean earnings of $109,900; about $45,500 less than their male counterparts. As of 2016, female physicians have statistically been found to make about $18,677 less than male physicians. Pay disparities for female physicians has also been blamed on women not wanting to commit to leadership roles which pay higher salaries. Besides gender biases, it is also believed that female physicians are paid less because they are more likely to bill their patients less (as they fear their patient will be unable to pay their bill) and are less likely to be aggressive when negotiating their salary and contract. Despite female physicians making less money and being less likely to bill, a study done in 2017 across 24.4 million primary care offices showed that they are often the ones spending more time in direct patient care per visit, per day, and per year.

Communal specialties, which women are more likely to go into, often have a lower pay than the specialties in which men typically go into. Women have been found to have a larger representation than men in lower-paying specialties, such as pediatrics and men have a larger representation in higher-paying specialties, such as cardiology and surgery. In New York State between 1999 and 2008, the average starting salary for men was $187,385 whereas the mean starting salary for women was $158,727. In 2001, it was found that male physicians earned roughly around 41% more than their female colleagues. As of 2017, an updated version then found that the percentage had dropped to roughly around 27.7%. That is roughly around a 100,000 dollar difference in salary per year. However, women who work in radiology are the only women who make more than their male colleagues—the difference is only about 2,000 dollars. A study published in 2005 found that women physicians in the US had an annual earning gap of 11% if they were married, 14% if they had one child, and 22% if they had more than one child. Women typically had household obligations that affected their ability to work as much as men and therefore led to a trade-off of higher earnings for family-friendly jobs.

Traditional gender norms

Traditional gender norms are another barrier female physicians face in the medical field. According to research, having children is a career stopper for female physicians. It is reported that approximately 30% of female physicians have faced discrimination for either being pregnant or needing to breastfeed/pump. Besides this, female physicians are seven times more likely to not work part time when compared to men as their maternity leaves are on average four weeks shorter than what the American Academy of Pediatrics recommends. It was found that the percentage of female clinicians working part-time in either a hospital setting or a general physician's office after having a child is much higher than the percentage of these women working full-time after having a child (92.7%, 96.3% 59.2%, 76.5% respectively). Along with this, female physicians are often paid less because traditional gender norms put child rearing responsibilities on the mother. In addition to already having a stressful job, research shows that the amount of domestic tasks and responsibilities, as well as family care is still the same. This led to the concept of having a work-life balance being more challenging for women.

Patient sexism

Female physicians have reported encountering sexism in their work. Female physicians are often mistaken for nurses by patients. Patients have also been reported to have less trust in their physician if they are female and instead ask for a second opinion from a male physician.

Medical school sabotage

Female physicians also face gender bias in medical schools. In 2018, Tokyo Medical University lowered the test scores of its female applicants. Since 2006, the university has been subtracting points from the exams of female applicants while adding, on average, 20 points to the exams of male applicants.

Unfair testing scores are not the only thing that are troubling in medical school; women, especially in more recent times, have been the majority group at medical school, they still face discrimination as men are often given the "decision-making" positions/ supervising positions at medical institutions. This creates a gap for mistreatment through faulty (sexist, discriminating,& etc.) supervisors.

More recently, the percentage of women being admitted to medical school (50.5%) is higher than men (48.5%). Even with an increase in racial and ethnically diversity amongst both genders, there is still underrepresentation in the actual medical profession.

== Women in leadership positions ==
=== Cardiovascular medicine ===
From a broad perspective, women hold a larger number of leadership roles in politics and in the workforce than ever before in the United States. Yet, the cardiology specialty remains dominated by men, being that in 2015, only 13.2% of cardiologists were women. Surveys have shown that the reasoning behind this may be due to a desire for a better work–life balance for women and a negative perception of cardiology. Although there is a discrepancy in the number of female physicians specialized in cardiology, women in cardiology have become more involved in leadership roles. These roles may be in research science, health systems administration, professional societies and clinical practice. In scientific research, women have made an impact in scientific inquiry and investigation into the causes and treatments of cardiovascular disease. In leadership roles for the professional cardiology societies, women have increasingly become more involved worldwide. In educational systems, women have become more involved in cardiovascular service and in serving as clinical chiefs and program directors. However, there is still a gap in the number of women serving as deans, chairs of departments, and university presidents. Women make up only 15% of medical school deans and interim deans. Studies have found that women tend to not advance at the same rate as men in the medical field. This could be due to women not receiving independent grants, publications, and leadership positions. Additionally, differences in pay could be attributed to implicit gender and maternal bias. Implicit bias can affect hiring and promoting of women in the medical field because of a belief that women should be held at a higher standard than their male peers. Overall, underrepresentation in the medical field could influence patient care and outcomes. Diversity promotes health equity, and the medical field is continually improving its efforts toward finding the root of the problem of under-representation of women in the medical field.

=== Obstetrics and gynecology ===
In 2018, 59% of gynecologists were women, yet there still is a pay gap based on gender in this specialty. Female obstetrician-gynecologists face barriers in advancing into leadership positions and earn around $36,000 less a year than their male counterpart. Although sexism in the medical field has often been associated with women, discrimination has been noted by male populations of obstetricians-gynecologists. Male obstetricians-gynecologists can be negatively impacted by a patient's desire to have a female clinician for a woman's health care needs. Due to socially prescribed roles for men and women, men are often discouraged from entering this specialty and can receive judgement based on unconscious or conscious bias.

A 2018 study, published in the Journal of Obstetrics and Gynecology, found that women in obstetrics and gynecology faced discrimination based on differences in salary, and men in obstetrics and gynecology faced discrimination based on patient preferences.

== Gender roles ==
According to a study done in 2003, the numbers of women in medicine have increased significantly. This trend continues into today. Gender difference have been found in the motivations for applying to medical school. Studies suggest that "male applicants are more motivated by financial, prestige, scientific and technical issues, whereas female applicants stress more "person orientated humanistic and altruistic reasons". Gender differences have also been found in "attitudes toward health promotion".

In addition, male and female clinicians are likely to use different styles of communication. Male doctors were found to be more likely to "speak in an authoritative manner, give direct commands to patients, interrupt more, are perceived as more imposing and presumptuous, spend less time with patients, make fewer positive statements and smile and nod less". Some studies have found that female doctors "provide more intensive therapeutic milieu that could lead to more open exchange and comprehensive diagnosis and treatment". In addition, females have been found to take more precautionary measures and give more tests than men are.

There is also a connection between gender roles in the medical field and family pressures. A 2020 study performed by the British Medical Journal analyzed how doctors combined their working lives with having a normal family life. This study analyzed three different strategies used by men and women in order to cope with managing a normal family life and a work-heavy career. The three different types of strategies that men and women use are "career dominant, segregated, and accommodated". When it comes to the career dominant strategy, about 15% of women and 3% of men adopt this strategy. This strategy "implies a continuous, full time career and a reduced family life—living single or divorced and childless as a consequence of the career". The segregated strategy is composed of 55% of women and 85% of men, and it "implies a continuous, full time career with family roles organized so as to enable more time to be devoted to the career". And lastly, the accommodating strategy is adopted by 30% of women and 12% of men. This strategy "implies that work involvement has been reduced in some way to allow more time for family roles". As can be seen by these statistics, men are more likely than women to devote more time to their job as opposed to their family.

A 2019 study found that female doctors have higher rates of burnout, while 73% of respondents said gender discrimination "has diminished their morale and career satisfaction".

== Stereotype threats ==
A stereotype threat is observed when a stigmatized group is in a situation where negative stereotypes are often used in interpreting their behavior, and the risk of being judged by these stereotypes can elicit a disruptive state that undermines performance and aspirations. As discussed earlier, there are less women in leadership positions in academic medicine. Descriptive and prescriptive gender stereotypes affect women in these roles. A descriptive component consists of beliefs about the inherent characteristics of men and women. At the center of these beliefs is that women are more nurturing, sympathetic kind and caring. Men are often described as agentic or assertive, ambitious and independent. Stereotype threats against women are especially common for women in leadership roles. The stereotype-based perspective towards women has been used to explain the lack of fit for leadership roles in medicine. These stereotypes canter on perceived characteristics, skills and aspirations of women and how they have been perceived to not coincide with what us valued for effective leadership. In a twenty-year study done on stereotype threats, researchers found that stereotype threats can increase feelings of anxiety, mind-wandering, negative thinking, and can decrease the function of working memory. A functional working memory is needed to successfully execute a task in many scenarios. This study also found that individuals experiencing stereotype threats may find it necessary to negate these threats and put forth effort to suppress these thoughts which can be inconsistent with the goals of the task.

Many women face various forms of harassment due to stereotypes held by male coworkers/supervisors as well as their own patients. In a Twitter tweet, Dr. Marjorie Stiegle asked her fellow healthcare peers to share their stories on gender bias in medicine. Although she only needed 30 replies, over 200 replies (mainly women) stated they faced a lot of harassment over wanting to or to not have children. Some women quoted they were told that they could not be a mother and a doctor. Some women share their experiences with patients bringing up their body, looks, and the topic of children in unnecessary situations. Although the tweet was supposed to originally be used for a podcast, it ended up showing the different forms of harassment that women and men face in the medical field.

== Male clinicians ==
Males make up approximately 12% of nurses in the United States. Unfortunately, when men enter the profession of nursing, they may encounter barriers that limit their choice of specialty. They run the risk of being labeled and stereotyped, in addition to being relied upon excessively for their strength in lifting patients. These gender biases and role stereotyping occur because many people retain the notion that caring for others is a feminine task, and thus beneath the status of the male.

In a British study, it was reported that the majority of subjects assumed that a nurse referred to a female. This type of stereotyping of men is related to nursing being considered a profession for women. Men tend to face two common stereotypes when it comes to being nurses. The first being the stereotype that male nurses are gay since they are in a "feminine occupation". The other common stereotype is that men are generally hypersexual and that this will inhibit them from being able to provide intimate care to women in nonsexual ways.

Male nurses report being told that a female nurse is preferred and being teased as a child for wanting to be a nurse.

Other questions are often asked of male nurses such as 'why did you go into nursing'? Or they are asked if they are gay, failed medical school, or became a nurse because it was easier. Sometimes a male nurse can be asked if he is a nurse so that he can see undressed women. In some instances male nurses were assumed to be the 'muscle' for other female nurses.

Male nurses may be passed over for work with female patients, or disallowed on birthing or gynecological units, while male physicians are completely welcome in these situations. In addition, male nurses find that they are pushed toward tasks that are stereotypically consistent with their gender role. Some of these might include heavy lifting, administrative roles, or psychiatric nursing.

Despite these drawbacks, male nurses on average make more money than their female counterparts, mostly due to them performing higher-paying tasks.

== See also ==
- Gender-bias in medical diagnosis
- Gender disparities in health
- Gender pay gap in medicine
- Occupational sexism
- Women in medicine
- Women's health
- Lateral violence
- Reverse sexism
- Men in nursing
