= Gender bias in medical diagnosis =

Concept in medical & psychological diagnoses

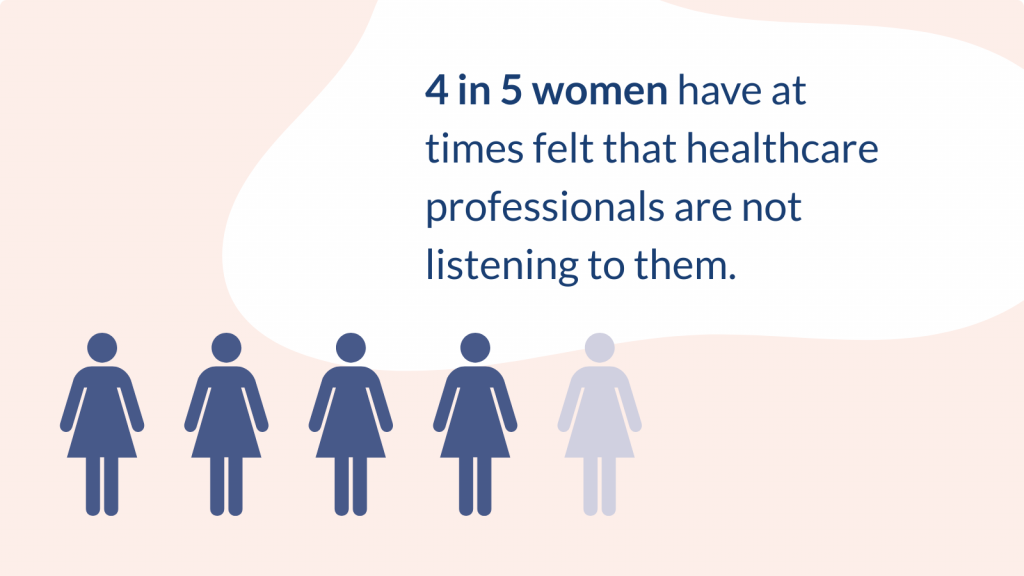
Not being listened to is a common experience of women in healthcare.

Gender-biased diagnosing is the idea that medical and psychological diagnosis are influenced by the patient's gender. Several studies have found evidence of differences in diagnosis for individuals with similar ailments but of different sexes. Female patients face discrimination through the denial of treatment or miss-classification of diagnosis as a result of not being taken seriously due to stereotypes and gender bias. For women of color, gender bias intersects with racial bias, potentially leading to greater disparities in medical treatment. Many historical medical studies were done on men thus overlooking many issues that were related to women's health. This topic alone sparked controversy and questions about the medical standard of our time. Popular media has illuminated the issue of gender bias in recent years. Research on diseases affecting women more was less funded than those affecting men and women equally.

== Medical bias ==
The possibility of gender differences in experiences of pain has led to a discrepancy in treating female patients' pain over that of male patients. The phenomenon may affect physical diagnosis. Women are more likely to be given a diagnosis of psychosomatic nature for a physical ailment than men, despite presenting with similar symptoms. Women sometimes have trouble being taken seriously by physicians when they have a medically unexplained illness, and report difficulty receiving appropriate medical care for their illnesses because doctors repeatedly diagnose their physical complaints as related to psychiatric problems or simply related to female's menstrual cycle.

Clinical offices that rely on healthcare routines become less distinct due to biased medical knowledge of gender. There is a distinct differentiation between gender and sex in the medical sense. Because gender is the societal construction of what femininity and masculinity are, whereas sex refers to the biological characteristics that differentiate female and male. The way of lifestyle and the place in society are often considered when diagnosing patients.

An example of a specific condition from which an extreme gender bias and differential medical attention and treatment can be noted is that of Cardiovascular disease. Of this condition, Coronary heart disease is the most prevalent; with women more often than men reported as fatalities. For example, women who are experiencing a heart attack are seven times more likely to be misdiagnosed and released from the hospital during the heart attack. This difference is often because women generally experience different heart attack symptoms, like flu-like symptoms, than men. Due to sex based medical prerogatives, women tend to be more concerned with their primary and secondary sex health characteristics; i.e., gynecological health and breast health especially in terms of cancer; as opposed to heart health. Furthermore, mortality rates of women have increased since 1979; whereas men's conversely have displayed a decline. This can be attributed to differential treatment, specifically; preventative measures, refined diagnostic techniques and advanced medical and surgical capabilities that are directly catered to men's health. One proposed explanation of gender bias pertaining to cardiac concerns and treatment is that men are more likely report or assume symptoms to be cardiac related than women, i.e., stress, (in stressful situations, personal situations or as a controlled variable); however these hypothesis were found to be inconsistent. When addressing women's health in relation to cardiovascular health, sexed based differences are imperative in acknowledging in order appropriately diagnose and treat symptoms. Specific diagnostic criteria for assessing women's cardiovascular health include: evaluating for high levels of triglycerides/low levels of HDL cholesterol (after menopause), diabetes, smoking, metabolic syndrome, gestational diabetes, and pre-eclampsia.

=== Sex Differences and Clinical Trials ===
Men and women are biologically different. They differ in the mechanical workings of their hearts and in their lung capacities, resulting in women being 20-70% more likely to develop lung cancer. The differences between men and women are also seen at the cellular level. For example, the ways immune cells convey pain signals are different in men and women. As a result of these biological differences, men and women react to certain drugs and medical treatments differently. One example is opioids. When using opioids for pain relief, women and men have different reactions. Surveys of the literature also conclude that there is a need for more clinical trials that study the gender specific response to opioids.

Although there is evidence pointing to the biological difference between men and women, historically women have been excluded from clinical trials and men have been used as the standard. This male standard has its roots in ancient Greece, where the female body was viewed as a mutilated version of the male body. However, the male bias was furthered in the United States in the 1950s and 60s after the FDA issued guidelines excluding women of childbearing potential from trials to avoid any risk to a potential fetus. Additionally, the thalidomide tragedy led the FDA to issue regulations in 1977 recommending that women should be excluded from participating in Phase I and Phase II studies in the US. Studies also excluded women for other reasons including that women were more expensive to use as test subjects because of fluctuating hormone levels. The assumption that women would have the same reaction to the treatments as men was also used to justify excluding women from clinical trials.

However, more recent studies have shown that women respond differently to a variety of common drugs than men, including sleeping pills, antihistamines, aspirin and anesthesia. As a result, many drugs may actually pose health risks to women. For example, a 2001 study conducted by the Government Accountability Office about drugs removed from the market between 1997 and 2000 showed that "Eight of the 10 prescription drugs posed greater health risks for women than for men."

=== Pain bias ===
In recent decades, there has been increasing attention given to the disparity between the treatment of pain in females compared to males. Chronic pain is more prevalent in women than in men, and women report more severe, frequent, and prolonged cases of pain; however, they are less likely to receive adequate health treatment. Over 90% of women with chronic pain believe that they are treated differently by healthcare professionals because of their gender.

Providers are also more likely to under-estimate female patientsʻ pain compared to males' pain. Studies show that physicians often perceive women's complaints as emotional responses rather than physiological pain. Women are often referred to psychiatrists for treatment, and prescribed sedatives or psychotherapy medications. In addition, women are less likely to be prescribed painkillers after surgeries, according to several studies conducted in the 1980s. For example, after undergoing coronary artery bypass surgery, women received more sedatives rather than pain treatment. Studies from the 2000s showed that physicians dismissed women's pain as inexplicable because they refused to believe the complaints; some physicians even blamed the female patients for their pain.

There are still gendered attitudes towards reporting uncontrolled pain to a healthcare provider. An exploratory study in 2020 found that women are more likely to advocate for themselves and use more varied self-advocacy strategies. However, this finding is contradictory, as women actually receive less pain treatment and experience worse health outcomes than men.

=== Western cultural recognition of pain bias ===
As the issue of pain bias becomes more popular, media coverage of the topic has also increased. In 2014, the National Pain Report conducted an online national survey of almost 2,600 women with a variety of chronic pain conditions. 65% felt that their pain was being given inadequate attention because they were female, and 91% believed that the health-care system discriminated against women. Nearly half of the women were told that their pain was psychological, and 75% were told they must learn to deal with the pain. In 2015, The Atlantic published an article about a woman's experience with acute abdominal pain. She had to wait almost two hours at the emergency room before receiving treatment, but she endured the pain longer than necessary due to a misdiagnosis. In the United States, women wait an average of 65 minutes before receiving an analgesic for acute abdominal pain, while men only wait 49 minutes. A 2019 article published by The Washington Post references a 2008 study that supports the statements made in 2015 The Atlantic article.

=== Consequences of bias ===
A study from NIH regarding aversion to medical attention shows 33.3% of participants receiving "unfavorable evaluations", largely deriving from skepticism in physician care. Experience and historical misdiagnosis/misrepresentation in healthcare leads to apprehension towards medical care such as avoidance to medical attention for a prolonged period of time. Oftentimes this results in medical conditions worsening or going untreated, potentially leading to higher rates of mortality. This may exhibit itself as iatrophobia or an extreme fear of healthcare. Though primarily an Anxiety disorder, it derives from fear of malpractice or death, it affects 12% of adults and 19% of children.

Even when they are not discouraged from seeking healthcare, women oftentimes do not receive adequate care for their medical issues. 1/10 women must see their primary healthcare provider ten or more times before they are able to receive treatment, especially for issues relating to menopause. However, some women are unable to find medical help despite repetition of visits; a study published in the British Medical Journal found that over half of women with chronic pain reported not receiving effective care for it, even after visiting 6+ different medical facilities.

The dismissal of symptoms women often face from their providers can be dangerous as well, with symptoms indicative of a severe condition being ignored or misattributed to something less serious. 13,000+ women and AFAB nonbinary people from Victoria, Australia reported having severe symptoms dismissed by health providers. These accounts came from people across all ages, indicating that this dismissal is not specific to one age demographic. Moreover, a study conducted by Harvard Health found that women are significantly less likely to be sent to a cardiac specialist when exhibiting symptoms of heart disease than men, demonstrating either a lack of competency when it comes to women's health, or a purposeful bias preventing women from receiving adequate medical care.

== Psychological diagnosis ==
Studies have shown that gender bias exists in many psychological areas. Primarily, it can appear within the caregiver assigning the diagnosis, particularly if that caregiver is male. A Polish study conducted in 2016 gave clinical therapists identical case files, with the one difference being gender of the patient. While female therapists tended to diagnose the same regardless of gender, male therapists were more likely to assign a more severe diagnosis and recommend professional treatment if they were told the patient was female.

Personality disorders are a place where significant diagnosis bias can be observed. When diagnosing from DSM criteria, men are generally more likely to be diagnosed with an antisocial personality disorder, (a personality disorder where the patient exhibits a severe indifference to others) while women were more likely to be diagnosed with a histrionic personality disorder (a personality disorder characterized by the patient committing extreme and emotional acts for the purpose of attention-seeking). However, ways of controlling this existing bias have been discussed. Studies have found that utilizing a personalized model of a patient's personality to diagnose a disorder rather than a simple list of criteria, such as that from the DSM, helps to reduce the amount of gender bias that occurs, as it places symptoms in the context of the person experiencing them rather than in the context of cultural understanding. The lack of accuracy from the DSM criteria may be attributed to it being written primarily by males, and thus being more male-centric in its ideas of how symptoms reveal themselves in patients. Thus, symptoms exhibited only by females may not be included in DSM criteria, causing potential misdiagnoses or a lack of diagnosis where one should be for women. Misattribution of symptoms can also be partially explained by how characteristics and traits often seen as cultural or social indicators of feminine behavior are often interpreted as pathological symptoms of personality disorders, and vice versa: many view behaviors indicative of personality/emotion disorders, such as violence or reckless actions, as less extreme when expressed by men rather than women, and so physicians may implicitly engage in bias by regarding these as normal behaviors due to social stereotypes.

Another area in which diagnosis disparities between genders have been noted is in depression; women are 44% more likely to have diagnosed clinical depression than men. A Swedish study from 2020 found little difference in overall affect (well-being) between genders, suggesting that disparities in prevalence between genders may be due to bias from the healthcare provider assigning the diagnosis. Two explanations for this hypothesis were provided. First, as seen within personality disorders, the perception of women as frail and overemotional may play a part; a similar baseline in males and females may likely be interpreted as healthy for the former but symptoms indicative of poor mental health in the latter. The alternative hypothesis, and the one listed as less likely to be true, is that depression in men is under-diagnosed due to men's noted difficulty in accurately expressing their emotional state. However, it is not universally agreed upon that women having more cases of depression is due to misdiagnosis, and some believe that women's higher depression levels could be attributed to an overall higher degree of stress or stressors in their lives as compared to men, as depression can be influenced by outside social, political, or societal factors. Regardless, women are definitively at a higher risk of being prescribed unnecessary medication for depression or anxiety. Women with depression are 31% more likely to be taking antidepressants than men, and it has been recorded that male prescribers are more likely to prescribe antidepressants to women than to men.

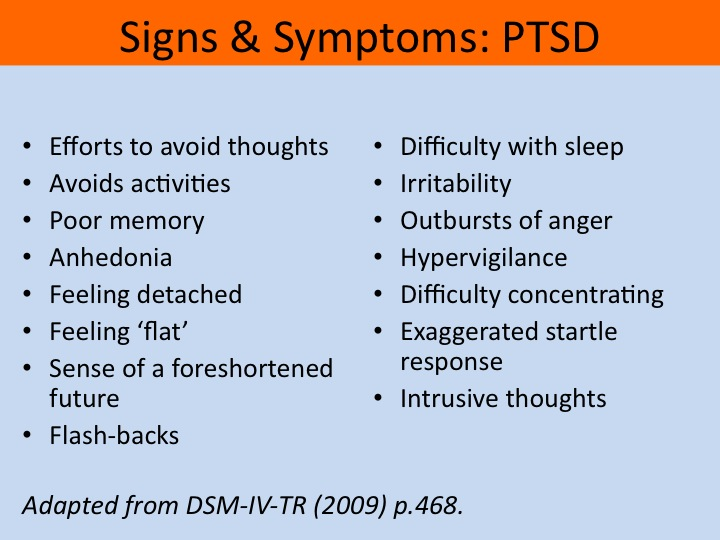
The signs and symptoms of PTSD

Results from a 2009 study concluded that patient gender does not affect diagnosis of PTSD or BPD, and this finding is consistent with research suggesting that women are not more likely to be given the BPD diagnosis, all else being equal. The data also did not support an effect of clinician gender or age on diagnosis. However, other studies have found that PTSD symptoms are more likely to be increasingly severe in women than in men.

A 2012 study examined gender-specific associations between trauma cognition, alcohol cravings and alcohol-related consequences in individuals with dually diagnosed PTSD and alcohol dependence (AD). Participants had entered a treatment study for concurrent PTSD and AD; baseline information was collected from participants about PTSD-related cognition in three areas: (a) Negative Cognition About Self, (b) Negative Cognition About the World, and (c) Self-Blame. Information was also collected on two aspects of AD: alcohol cravings and consequences of AD. Gender differences were examined while controlling for PTSD severity. The results indicate that Negative Cognition About Self are significantly related to alcohol cravings in men but not women, and that interpersonal consequences of AD are significantly related to Self-Blame in women but not in men. These findings suggest that for individuals with co-morbid PTSD and AD, psycho-therapeutic interventions that focus on reducing trauma-related cognition are likely to reduce alcohol cravings in men and relational problems in women.

== Female patients ==
Women have been described in studies and in narratives as hysterical and neurotic, and many feel that physicians take their pain less seriously. Historically, women's health was only associated with reproductive health, and thus has often been called "bikini medicine" because the field largely focused on the anatomy covered by a bathing suit. Until recently, clinical research mainly used male subjects, male cells, and male mice. Many women were excluded from research because they were considered too weak, too variable, and in need of protection from the harms associated with medical research studies. Studies important in understanding drug behavior in the male-body were extrapolated to female patients as well. This practice occurred despite biological differences in disease presentation between females and males, and the fact that women are more prone to experiencing adverse reactions to medication. Modern research on human subjects are made up of approximately an equal distribution of female and male subjects, but female subjects in research are largely still underrepresented in specific areas of medical research, like cardiovascular research and drug studies. Physicians' narratives often suggest that women's complaints are seen as exaggerated or invalid. Historically, women have been viewed as less stable than men, leading physicians to attribute their physical ailments to emotions. In general, women's symptoms are frequently dismissed, leading to high rates of misdiagnosis, unacknowledged symptoms, or assumptions of a psychosomatic origin.

A significant disparity exists in the treatment of physically attractive versus physically unattractive patients, a bias that is more pronounced in females. Female patients who are considered conventionally attractive are thought to be experiencing less pain than unattractive female patients. Female patients have also been considered more demanding patients, and are considered to be a greater burden than male patients. One observer has stated that, "different forms of female suffering are minimized, mocked, coaxed into silence." In the medical community, women are perceived as having to "prove they are as sick as male patients," what the medical community has deemed "Yentyl Syndrome."

=== Intersection of gender and racial bias ===
Specifically, Black women and women of color (WoC) are faced with significant bias surrounding their medical experiences, due to the intersectionality of their gender and racial identities. Black women are more likely to have adverse maternal health outcomes compared to white women. Their death rate from maternal mortality is 3-4 times higher than white women. Black women are also more likely to endure hypertensive disorders of pregnancy, leading to elevated blood pressure. They also experience lower rates of follow-up care during postpartum, a crucial period where 52% of maternal mortality occurs. When meeting with healthcare providers during postpartum, Black women are less likely to be recommended beneficial treatments or counseling due to the historical stereotype that Black patients have a biologically higher pain tolerance, a concept rooted in anti-Black racism. Bias has been shown to play a role in these disparate outcomes. In counties with higher racial prejudice, there is a noticeable difference in rates of birth complications, like low birthweight and preterm births, between Black and white women. Additionally, Black women face greater challenges when it comes to breast cancer. Black women with breast cancer have a 40% higher mortality rate than white women, despite the fact that the prevalence rates of the disease between the two groups are similar. In the U.S., the leading cause of death for both Black and Hispanic women is breast cancer. In terms of preventative care, Black women get genetically tested for breast cancer at lower rates compared to white women, which may be attributed to health care providers writing referrals for Black women less frequently. For Black and other minority women who do undergo genetic testing, their risk of breast cancer is typically underestimated, due to research limitations and risk assessment models being based on data collected from white women.

The recognition of intersectionality in medical research remains inconsistent. Understanding how sexism and racism jointly affect the health of WoC is essential for inclusive research. A scoping review published in the International Journal of Nursing Studies Advances analyzed 131 peer-reviewed research articles by nurse scientists to assess how intersectionality was incorporated into their work. The findings revealed that while many studies acknowledged intersectionality, 18% did not define the term, and only 47% explicitly applied an intersectional lens to analyze their results. This suggests that while the concept is recognized, its practical application in research remains limited. Some scholars argue that race-evasiveness—the minimization of how race influences health outcomes—may contribute to the limited integration of intersectional analysis. This practice reinforces whiteness as the default framework for medical research and decision-making, which can have serious consequences. For example, maternal health symptoms often present differently in Black and white women, yet symptoms experienced by Black women are more likely to be overlooked.

=== Complementary and Alternative Medicine ===
Poor treatment in traditional medicine coupled with minimal access to healthcare can lead to a preference towards Complementary and Alternative Medicine (CAM). Largely used in communities of color, CAM includes methods outside of standard medicinal care which range from nutrition to prayer. Communities of color use CAM to feel more in control of their health, partly due to mistrust in healthcare amid cultural reasons and medicinal preferences.

Though physicians discourage the use of CAM, advocates such as Janine A. Blackman argue the communication gap between practitioner and patient needs to improve. Distrust and a stigma surrounding alternative medicine puts WoC at a greater risk of preventable illness. Most barriers to healthcare are derived from insurance and medical inaccessibility (namely poor or limited healthcare, distance from medical services and financial obstacles).

Many physicians encourage open discussion surrounding alternative medicine to encourage well researched medicinal practices or discourage potentially harmful decisions. In these efforts, practitioners are encouraged by their peers to learn more about CAM to better serve their patients.

=== Aging women ===
See main article: Menopause

Contemporary healthcare approaches face a significant gap in understanding and addressing age-related diseases specifically in females. Age bias in healthcare often overlooks the unique challenges faced by aging women, who tend to outlive men but experience more pronounced physical and cognitive declines. This is particularly evident in the context of menopause. Menopause is a gradual hormonal change, typically onset between the ages of 48 and 52 wherein menstrual periods cease, and women are no longer able to conceive and bear children. Menopausal symptoms include hot flashes, mood swings, vaginal dryness, fatigue, weight gain, among others.

The Women's Health Initiative (WHI) hormone therapy (HT) trials, conducted between 1993 and 2004, demonstrated efforts to address gender bias in medical diagnosis by providing insights into managing menopausal symptoms. These trials aimed to evaluate the benefits and risks of HT in preventing chronic diseases such as coronary heart disease (CHD) and invasive breast cancer in mostly healthy postmenopausal women. Despite finding that HT can effectively manage moderate-to-severe menopausal symptoms in healthy women in early menopause, the study does not recommend HT for preventing chronic diseases. It also advises caution in older age groups considering HT due to the increased risk of vasomotor symptoms and CHD.

A 2001 research interview study examined personal experiences, where age of patients within patient-doctor interactions correlated with negative experiences relating to validity and treatment of health concerns, for menopause specifically. This study, involving 61 women from various backgrounds, discovered that patients reported experiencing symptoms of menopause in their early thirties and late forties. However, they were often dismissed because their age did not align with the estimated average age for experiencing these symptoms.

Another significant impact of menopause is osteoarthritis. Women aged 50 to 60 years are 3.5 times more likely to develop osteoarthritis than men in the same age group. This decline in bone density is attributed to the hormonal changes that occur during menopause, differences in musculoskeletal system, and varying biomechanics. For example, a 2020 cross-sectional study demonstrated that women with knee osteoarthritis had a decline in functional performance and quality of life.

Women also exhibit a higher susceptibility to dementia compared to men, experiencing more frequent and rapid declines in cognitive function with aging. Dementia encompasses various conditions, including Alzheimer's disease and vascular dementia. Women, including those with dementia, are more frequently prescribed specific classes of psychotropic medications, such as sleep aids, which may heighten the risk of cognitive impairment.

Age bias presents significant challenges for aging women in the diagnosis and treatment of medical conditions. For example, a 2000 study found that emergency department nurses had varying views on the importance and likelihood of myocardial infarction among male and female patients seeking evaluation and treatment. Healthcare providers' failure to recognize the symptoms of myocardial infarction in middle-aged women may contribute to higher morbidity and mortality rates among this group. To mitigate age bias in women's healthcare, healthcare providers are recommended to receive training on gender sensitivity and age-related issues, ensuring they understand the diverse healthcare needs of women of all ages.

== Avoiding gender bias ==
Researchers should conduct all studies with both male and female subjects in their samples. From a research based perspective, we also need to increase women's participation in conducting research to directly and indirectly address women's health concerns. A 2023 study of publications in "Clinical Pharmacology and Therapeutics" and "Clinical and Translational Science" found that women make up less than 40% of all study authors. A similar study in 2024 found that women make up 40% of first authors and 20.4% of last authors in clinical studies, with some disciplines having as low as 9% female first authorship and 7.8% female last authorship.

Healthcare workers should not assume all men and women are the same, even if they display similar symptoms. In a study done to analyze gender bias, a physician in the research sample stated, '"I am solely a professional, neutral and genderless"'. While a seemingly positive statement, this kind of thought process can ultimately lead to gender biasing because it does not note the differences between men and women that must be taken into account when diagnosing a patient. To avoid gender bias, we must also expand our inclusion of sex and gender in medicine to be more nuanced, providing more opportunities for sex and gender to be accounted for in research and implementing healthcare practices and policies that are more gender inclusive and affirming. Other ways to avoid gender bias includes diagnostic checklists which help to increase accuracy, evidenced-based assessments and facilitation of informed choices.

== Clinical trials and research ==
The approach to women shifted from paternalistic protection to access in the early 1980s as AIDS activists like ACT UP and women's groups challenged ways that drugs were developed. The NIH responded with policy changes in 1986, but a Government Accountability Office report in 1990 found that women were still being excluded from clinical research. That report, the appointment of Bernadine Healy as the first woman to lead the NIH, and the realization that important clinical trials had excluded women led to the creation of the Women's Health Initiative at the NIH and to the federal legislation, the 1993 National Institutes of Health Revitalization Act, which mandated that women and minorities be included in NIH-funded research. The initial large studies on the use of low-dose aspirin to prevent heart attacks that were published in the 1970s and 1980s are often cited as examples of clinical trials that included only men, but from which people drew general conclusions that did not hold true for women. In 1993 the FDA reversed its 1977 guidance, and included in the new guidance a statement that the former restriction was "rigid and paternalistic, leaving virtually no room for the exercise of judgment by responsible research subjects, physician investigators, and investigational review boards (IRBs)".

The National Academy of Medicine published a report called "Women and Health Research: Ethical and Legal Issues of Including Women in Clinical Studies" in 1994 and another report in 2001 called "Exploring the Biological Contributions to Human Health: Does Sex Matter?" which each urged including women in clinical trials and running analyses on subpopulations by sex.

Although guidelines have been introduced, sex bias remains an issue. A 2001 meta-analysis found that of 120 trials published in the New England Journal of Medicine, on average just 24.6% of participants enrolled were women. In addition, the same 2001 meta-analysis found that 14% of the trials included sex specific data analysis.

A 2005 review by the International Council for Harmonisation of Technical Requirements for Pharmaceuticals for Human Use found that regulation in the US, Europe, and Japan required that clinical trials should reflect the population to whom an intervention will be given, and found that clinical trials that had been submitted to agencies were generally complying with those regulations.

A review of NIH-funded studies (not necessarily submitted to regulatory agencies) published between 1995 and 2010 found that they had an "average enrollment of 37% (±6% standard deviation [SD]) women, at an increasing rate over the years. Only 28% of the publications either made some reference to sex/gender-specific results in the text or provided detailed results including sex/gender-specific estimates of effect or tests of interaction."

The FDA published a study of the 30 sets of clinical trial data submitted after 2011, and found that for all of them, information by sex was available in public documents, and that almost all of them included sub-analyses by sex. In a 2019 meta-analysis it was reported that 36.4% of participants in 40 trials for anti-psychotic drugs were women. Another 2019 analysis found that worldwide 43% of clinical trial participants were women, with women's participation at around 49% female participants in the United States in 40% in non-US studies.

As of 2015, recruiting women to participate in clinical trials remained a challenge. However, efforts have been made by the U.S. government to expand women's health research and the inclusion of women in clinical studies. In 2016, the United States Congress passed the 21st Century Cures Act which codified into law the strengthening of women's health research through government funding. This act also established the policy at the National Institutes of Health known as sex as a biological variable (SABV), which requires basic research studies to examine sex in experimental design when relevant. In 2018, the U.S. Food and Drug Administration released draft guidelines for inclusion of pregnant women in clinical trials.

On March 18, 2024, U.S. President Joe Biden made an "executive order on advancing women's health research and funding." In this executive order, he called for the establishment of more stringent guidelines to women's health research, further funding for clinical studies on women's health, and reduction of barriers for female participants in trials. He also demanded funding be allocated to menopause research to promote women's health in the United States' aging population.

== History ==
The earliest traces of gender-biased diagnosing could be found within the disproportionate diagnosis of women with hysteria as early as 4000 years ago. Hysteria was earlier defined as excessive emotions; adapted from the Greek term, "Hystera", meaning "wandering uterus". These terms stemmed from mind-body associations regarding the uterus affecting women's overall health, especially emotionally and mentally. Within a medical setting, this hysteria translated to the over exaggeration of symptoms and ailments. Because traditional gender roles usually place women at a subordinate position compared to men, the medical industry has historically been dominated by men. This has led to misdiagnoses in females, often influenced by a predominantly male workforce in healthcare holding onto gender stereotypes. These gender roles and gender biases may have also contributed to why pain associated with experiences unique to women, like childbirth and menstruation, were dismissed or mistreated.

Women's overall health has long been associated with their reproductive abilities; further compounded by traditional views of sex, female gender roles, and femininity. Emotional and mental health are intertwined with reproductive functions, encompassing menstruation, fertility, and labor. Furthermore, societal expectations, including the desire for children, motherhood, subservience, and femininity, also play significant roles. More specifically, if a woman did not meet the expectations of reproductive functions (such as inconsistent menstruation cycles, inability to conceive or carry to term, as well as display negative reactions such as nausea, pain), it was assumed that she held resentment or non-desire to bear and raise children, as well as being defiant of her feminine nature and role. Conversely, if a woman were not to behave in alignment with femininity and gender role expectations (such as unable to maintain and care for family and housework, insubordinate, sick or in pain), then they were labeled as mentally ill or disturbed, often diagnosed with hysteria.

In a 1979 observational study, 104 women and men provided responses regarding their health in five areas: back pain, headaches, dizziness, chest pain, and fatigue. The study found that doctors tended to conduct more extensive checkups for men compared to women with similar complaints. This observation supports the notion that female patients are often taken less seriously than their male counterparts when reporting medical issues.

In 1990, the National Institutes of Health acknowledged the disparities in disease research between men and women. At this time, the Office of Research on Women's Health was created, primarily to raise awareness of how sex affects disease and treatments. In 1991 and 1992, recognition that a "glass ceiling" existed showcased that it was preventing female clinicians from being promoted. In 1993, the Women's Health Equity Act gave women the chance to participate in medical studies and examine gender differences. Before this, there had been no research done on infertility, breast cancer, and ovarian cancer, which are conditions prevalent to women's health. In 1994, the FDA created an Office of Women's Health by congressional mandate.

== See also ==
- Female hysteria
- Gender discrimination in the medical profession
- Gender disparities in health
- Implicit bias
- Lateral violence
- Men in nursing
- Occupational sexism
- Reverse sexism
- Women in medicine
- Women's health
