= Ice water =

Ice water may refer to:

== Music ==
- Ice Water (song), a song from Cat Power's second album Myra Lee
- Ice Water (album), an album by guitarist Leo Kottke
- Ice Water Inc., a music group affiliated with the Wu Tang Clan

== Other uses ==
- Ice Water (horse), a thoroughbred racehorse

== See also ==
- Cold pressor test, a cardiovascular test performed by immersing the hand into ice water
- Ice
- Water ice (disambiguation)
