= Pain Exhibit =

The PAIN Exhibit "is an educational, visual arts exhibit from artists with chronic pain with their art expressing some facet of the pain experience. The mission of the PAIN Exhibit is "to educate healthcare providers and the public about chronic pain through art, and to give voice to the many who suffer in silence".

The undertreatment of pain is a public health issue with an estimated 75 million Americans suffering from chronic nonmalignant pain.

The PAIN Exhibit was started in 2001 by Mark Collen, and the PainExhibit.com website was created by James Gregory. The site was launched March 8, 2004 and is available in both English and Spanish languages. PainExhibit.com currently contains 92 art images which are divided amongst nine themes.

Since its inception in 2001, Mark Collen has worked to further the mission of the PAIN Exhibit by writing articles for pain publications, as well as producing the patient brochure, “So You’ve Got Chronic Pain…What’s Next?” which was edited by Steven Feinberg, MD.The Ultimate List of 30 Natural Pain Relievers

== Press ==
Since 2003, the PAIN Exhibit has been included in over two dozen publications, including the Sacramento News and Review, the Sacramento Bee, the Buenos Aires Herald, and the New York Times.

PAIN Exhibit art images have donned 19 covers on pain journals. It has been featured on the cover of the Pain Practitioner, Arts and Learning Research Journal, and PAIN. PAIN Exhibit art also appeared regularly on the cover of the Journal of Pain and Palliative Care Pharmacotherapy between 2005 and 2008.

Other articles covering the PAIN Exhibit include the Brazilian publication IstoE’ and an Italian publication Panorama.
