= Water ice =

Water ice may refer to:

- Ice formed from water (as opposed to other substances)
- In ice climbing, ice made from flowing water (as opposed to ice from precipitation)
- The alternate term for various similar frozen fruit-flavoured desserts:
  - Italian ice, primarily in Philadelphia and the Delaware Valley
  - Sorbet

== See also ==
- Ice water (disambiguation)
