= Pederasty: An Integration of Cross-Cultural, Cross-Species, and Empirical Data controversy =

2005 academic essay on pederasty

Pederasty: An Integration of Cross-Cultural, Cross-Species, and Empirical Data (alternatively titled Pederasty: An Integration of Empirical, Historical, Sociological, Cross-Cultural, Cross-Species, and Evolutionary Perspectives) is an essay written by American psychologist Bruce Rind. It was written in 2005 and set to be published in a special issue of Haworth Press’ Journal Of Homosexuality. After far-right website WorldNetDaily published an article on the essay, Haworth Press cancelled its publication.

== History ==
As part of a special issue dedicated to homosexuality in antiquity, the Journal of Homosexuality planned to publish a number of essays on the topic. One of the essays, written by Bruce Rind, examined Pederasty through a cross-cultural perspective. Shortly before the issue was published, an article published on right-wing website WorldNetDaily denounced Rind's article.

Later that year, Haworth Press decided to pull the article from the issue. Later, the organization announced that they intended to publish Rind's article, alongside other essays on the topic of "adult–adolescent sexuality", on a later volume.

As of June 2009, a number of classicists were in the process of submitting the essay to be published by Taylor & Francis. The organization later decided that it would not publish the article. The article was ultimately published by Routledge.

== Reception ==
Barbara Fister, who worked at the Journal of Homosexuality's editorial board at the time, resigned soon after Haworth Press pulled the essay. She stated in 2012 that she had resigned "because it seemed wrong to do voluntary work for a publisher that was willing to override an editorial board’s decision in response to criticism".

An article published on Sexualities in 2006 described Haworth Press' actions as "a clear act of censorship; a preemptive attack on thought and debate".

A review of Rind's essay by L Eric Alcorn was published by Routledge in 2013.
