= Gender pay gap in medicine =

The gender pay gap in medicine refers to differences in average earnings between men and women working in medical careers. The gender pay gap is most commonly studied among physicians as difference in average pay between men and women across a workforce. A 2021 systematic review of international studies published since 2000 found that, across almost all included studies, women physicians earned less than men and that the gap persisted across time, specialties and countries, often amounting to tens of thousands of dollars per year even after accounting for measured demographic and work-related factors.

== Evidence ==
=== Global ===
A 2021 systematic review (46 empirical articles since 2000) concluded that the physician gender pay gap was persistent across time, specialty, and country; most studies reported lower pay for women physicians, sometimes by tens of thousands of dollars annually, including in analyses controlling for measured demographic and work characteristics.

=== England ===
In England, women hospital doctors earned, on average, 18.9% less than men; women general practitioners 15.3% less; and women clinical academics 11.9% less. The same summary reported larger unadjusted gaps when comparing total average pay without adjustment for contracted hours (e.g., 24.4% for hospital doctors and 33.5% for general practitioners).

A 2023 study reported a substantial hourly gender pay gap among public-sector doctors in Britain and found it to be large relative to comparator occupations, with a pronounced gap among high earners.

=== United States ===
In a 2020 study of primary care visits using claims and electronic health record data, women primary care physicians generated lower visit revenue overall than male colleagues in the same practices due to fewer visits and slightly fewer clinic days, while spending more time per visit on average.

A 2022 cross-sectional study modelled early-career earning potential among academic physicians and reported that women had lower starting salaries in most subspecialties and lower 10-year earning potential; the authors suggest that equalising starting salaries would account for a substantial portion of the observed early-career differences in earning potential.

A 2021 Association of American Medical Colleges analysis of faculty salary survey data reported that, with rare exceptions, White men had higher median compensation than women of all races and ethnicities and men of colour, and characterised gender as a primary driver of observed compensation inequities in those data.
