= Health survival paradox =

Sociological medical phenomenon

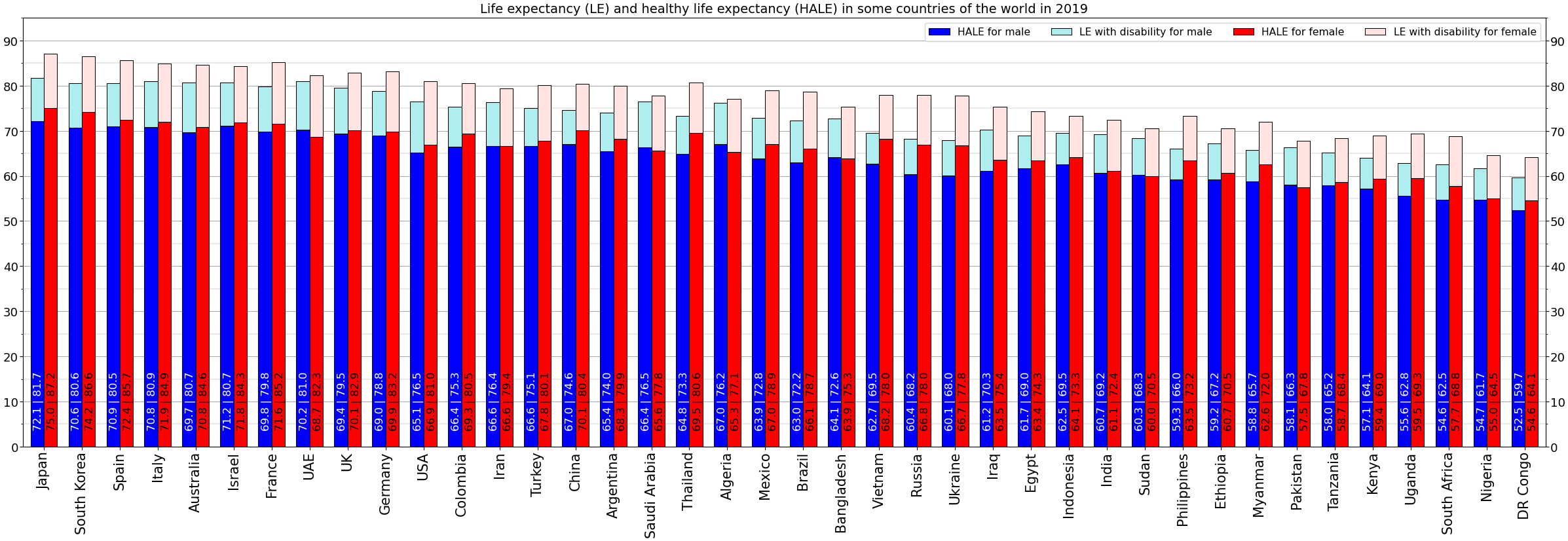
Sex gap in life expectancy and healthy life expectancy

The male-female health survival paradox, also known as the morbidity-mortality paradox or gender paradox, is the phenomenon in which female humans experience more medical conditions and disability during their lives, but live longer than males. The observation that females experience greater morbidity (diseases) but lower mortality (death) in comparison to males is paradoxical since it is expected that experiencing disease increases the likelihood of death. However, in this case, the part of the population that experiences more disease and disability is the one that lives longer.

== Background and history ==
Figure illustrating the three types of factors that may contribute to the male-female health survival paradox: biology, psychology, and social factors.

The male-female health survival paradox has been most reliably reported in literature and documented as far back as the 18th century in European historical records. Some of the last records of European men outliving women are from the Netherlands in 1860 and Italy in 1889. The earliest records of European women outliving men were from Sweden in 1751, Denmark in 1835, and both England and Wales in 1841. While women were documented to outlive men in Europe, data from 1887 through 1930 showed that females between ages 5 and 25 in Massachusetts disproportionately faced mortality due to infectious diseases. With improvements in infectious disease prevention, treatment, and eradication of Smallpox around the 1970s, mortality rates declined in both sexes. At this time, female life expectancy also peaked in the United States; females were expected to live eight years longer than males. Since the 1970s, the life expectancy gap between females and males has been on the decline in the United States and Western Europe.

Although more research needs to be completed, it is postulated that there is a "biopsychosocial" component which causes this paradox. In other words, women and men differ in biological, behavioral, and social factors which causes the male-female health survival paradox.

Biopsychosocial factors that have been hypothesized to cause this paradox include genetics, hormone differences, immunological differences, reproduction, chronic diseases, disability, physiological reserve, risk-related activities, illness perception, health reporting behavior, health care utilization, gender roles, and social assets and deficits.

Scholars relate the male-female health survival paradox to the concept of frailty, which is the vulnerability that the aging population has to adverse health outcomes. Such geriatric propensity to frailty is an emerging topic of research given new therapeutic interventions aimed at improving the health of the aging population, such as healthy nutrition, physical exercise, cognitive training, and multimodal interventions that encompass all of these components.

== Influential factors ==
=== Risk Factors and Behaviors ===
Different rates of alcohol and tobacco usage by men and women contribute to the paradox in developed countries. More women abstain from alcohol for lifetime, drink less, and have less drinking problems in comparison to men. However, more women tend to have alcohol-related disorders and withdrawal symptoms due to differences in pharmacokinetics and sex hormones.

Similarly, a review on substance-use disorder (SUDs) observed sex/gender differences on the biology, epidemiology, and treatment of substance-use disorder. Women were generally afflicted with more severe adverse events, but prognosis after treatment between men and women did not differ. However, due to conflict of emerging SUDs findings, future studies are needed to confirm whether biological and environmental constituents impact gender/sex differences on substance-use disorder.

It has also been stated that while men experience smoking-related conditions more than women, women have more trouble maintaining cessation than men. However, a recent review showed mixed findings on smoking behavior, and that bio-psycho-social factors may be more impactful than gender differences. In addition, a higher proportion of men use alternative tobacco options to replace cigarettes, and gender-based comparisons may be skewed from failing to stratify randomization in treatment groups.

=== Diseases ===
Men are more likely to suffer from heart disease, cancer, and stroke than women. These diseases are the main cause of the gender gap in life expectancy.

Despite men having more fatal conditions such as ischemic heart disease, lung cancer, liver cirrhosis, traffic accidents, and suicide, women have more non-fatal acute and chronic conditions. The majority of the female survival advantage is accounted for by differences in mortality rates between men and women ages 50–70 due to differing rates of cardiovascular diseases. While women report more symptoms and experience higher incidence of musculoskeletal and autoimmune disease, men have earlier and higher rates of cardiovascular diseases, after adjusting the data for the gap in life expectancy. Other studies report women having higher rates of cardiovascular disease, while not accounting for women having longer life expectancy. A recent review found that women afflicted with coronary heart disease are generally older and have more cardiovascular risks than men with coronary heart disease. While men have nearly twice the incidence of coronary heart disease and related mortality, women experience more incidence at increasing age.

Women also have higher rates of autoimmune disorders than men; one hypothesis for this is that testosterone facilitates immunosuppression in men, decreasing the likelihood men create autoantibodies that can target their own bodies, leading to autoimmune disease.

Most countries report higher rates of chronic kidney disease (CKD) in women compared to men. However, the difference in CKD rates may be due to the longer life expectancy of women, as kidney function declines with age. Although more women are diagnosed with CKD, among individuals diagnosed with CKD who are not on dialysis treatment, the men exhibit greater mortality rates compared to women. Studies investigating sex differences in kidney disease have suggested that men lose kidney function faster than women. It is hypothesized that this may be due to the protective effects of estrogens and the harmful effects of testosterone on the kidneys, or due to lifestyle differences between men and women.

=== Biological factors ===
Proposed explanations for the paradox range from genetic, hormonal, and physiological processes unique to females and males.

==== Genetic factors ====
The female sex has two X chromosomes that can protect against expression of recessive genes and allows a female survival advantage. A research study conducted on flies indicated that the alleles that contribute to male inclusive fitness also harm female health, and thus contribute to the paradox.

==== Physiological factors ====
It is also a possibility that the female hormone, estrogen, contributes to the female survival advantage. In cutaneous melanoma, estrogen was evaluated to determine its effect on a steroid hormone-sensitive cancer. While no difference in survival was concluded between two genders due to limited data, women tend to have better prognosis due to the presence of estrogen receptor beta. However, this is a continued study that may be due to biological factors—such as immune response, inflammation, pharmacokinetics, or hormones—or from social factors—such as women tending to have more ultraviolet protection and frequent medical visits.

Although studies have shown the protective effects of estrogen on cardiovascular health (i.e. by lowering LDL and increasing HDL) and brain cell health, there are doubts about the role of hormones due to mixed results in hormone replacement therapy studies on elderly women. For instance, although lower levels of LDL may prevent atherosclerotic buildup which can lead to chronic heart disease, estrogen may overall elevate chronic heart disease in older women with advanced plaque buildup by causing thrombosis.

Women can store excess high-density lipoproteins, which most likely slows the progression of plaque growth. Interestingly, calcium metabolism may contribute to the female mortality advantage. After age 35, where the human skeleton grows to its maximum size, calcium buildup increases significantly due to constant release from a deteriorating skeleton, less exercise for calcium release via sweating, and continued dietary intake. Consequently, excess calcium deposits in soft tissues, causing stiffening of arteries and higher blood pressure, leading to cardiovascular disease. For women, however, calcium influx can halt or be reversed during pregnancy and lactation. Women can also release calcium via menstrual cycle until menopause.

Women additionally have lower mortality rates in high-mortality conditions like famine and epidemics. In such conditions, most of the advantage comes from differences in infant mortality rates.

=== Social factors ===
Another possible explanation of the paradox is a social expectation of the female sex role, making women more willing to seek medical help sooner. There is mixed evidence on the role of help-seeking and reporting behavior, with some studies reporting that women are more likely to seek and report medical treatment for all symptoms, while others report that women only tend to seek more treatment on malaise-type symptoms.

As child bearers, females face maternal mortality, which peaked between 1900 and the 1930s. At the time, aseptic technique was not widely practiced, including during child delivery, abortions, and associated surgical procedures. Obstetrics was also a poorly regarded medical specialty where practitioners were poorly trained, if at all. In the early 1930s, hospitals in the United States began establishing rigorous physician qualification and practice guidelines to ensure sufficiently trained obstetricians, application of aseptic technique, and safe and effective deliveries. Other medical advancements, including antibiotic use, blood transfusions, and improved medication management during pregnancy, also improved maternal mortality. Collectively, these improvements reduced maternal mortality by 71%. However, the significant decrease in maternal mortality during this period only accounted for 14% of the longevity difference between females and males.

=== Psychological factors ===
A study conducted in the United States (US) consisting of 9,000 participants determined that women have a 1.5 times greater risk of experiencing a mood disorder compared to men. Additionally, a 2006 study examining mental health in New Zealand found that lifetime rates for major depression are higher in women (20.3%) compared to men (11.4%). Not only do women experience a greater preponderance of depression compared to men, they also experience greater severity of symptoms. The symptoms that women experienced with greater severity included weight gain and increased appetite, greater interpersonal sensitivity, and reduced energy. Women also experience onset of depression at an earlier age, and experience more years of depression when compared to men.

== Female survival advantage ==
Difference in average female and male life expectancy according to WHO for 2019.

Records of the female survival advantage can be traced back to the 18th century, but the phenomenon gained popularity and caught the eyes of researchers in the 19th century. Females outlive males for all age groups and every year for which reliable records exist. Specifically, in "contemporary industrialized countries", female survival is 1.5-2.0 times higher than that of males.

A female survival advantage is found in some, but not all species. Various explanations for this have been proposed but none are strongly supported. Most species studied for differences in morbidity and mortality between sexes show conditional sex differences in life span, with both male and females experiencing advantage depending on the species. In humans, females appear to have a consistent survival advantage. Females outlive males in 176 of 178 countries for which records are available, both at age 5 and at age 50. In a study in the UK, males scoring higher "femininity scores", when compared to their more stereotypical "masculine" male counterparts, had lower death rates from heart disease, suggesting that masculine behavior increases the risk of premature mortality.

The female survival advantage holds true among humans, but the same can not be said for baboons and birds. In a study conducted on Amboseli baboons, it was found that although females outlive their male counterparts, both sexes had either similar rates of age-related declines in health, or greater health declines in males compared to females. In another study focused on Eurasian Blackbirds found lower survival in females due to more passive phenotypes that increased predation susceptibility.

A significant biological factor that may contribute to the female survival advantage is the difference in sex chromosome composition in males and females. The male sex is biologically defined by having one Y sex chromosome, and is heterogametic, while females only have X chromosomes. Typically females have two X chromosomes, one active and one inactive, that can compensate one another for X chromosome gene mutations. In a longitudinal study following identical female twins and changes in X chromosome inactivation, skewed X chromosome inactivation patterns present at later stages of life suggested homologous sex chromosomes to benefit survival. Without multiple X chromosomes, males are more susceptible to X-linked diseases, or the effects of X chromosome mutations. These X-linked diseases include color blindness, hemophilia, and Duchenne muscular dystrophy.

== Male morbidity advantage ==
Although males experience greater mortality, they appear to have the advantage of lower morbidity. Females tend to report poorer health and more hospital visits than males. Females also have a greater tendency to develop psychological disorders compared to males. Females spend more years in good health than males; however, females spend more years in poor health than males as a proportion of their life expectancy. This implies that the male morbidity advantage is linked to the female survival advantage.

== Potential bias ==
Data collected from a research study in Denmark indicated that the paradox is likely due, in part, to selection bias. Females have higher preferences for absenteeism. On average, they are absent from work for health reasons more often than males, including when they do not have objectively worse health.

It may also be a possibility that under-reporting and selective non-participation of health problems, and delaying medical attention and treatment may make it appear that males have less medical problems than females. Misperceptions, such as females being more protected from cardiovascular diseases, may contribute to the morbidity-mortality paradox; females tend to have less aggressive treatment regimens, shown by having lower diagnostic angiograms and interventional procedures when compared to males.

Researchers also suggest that because males have been shown to have an increased likelihood of suddenly dying, females may appear to have higher incidence of morbidity when surveyed in research studies; in other words, females tend to outlive males, and the females carry diseases that are counted as morbidity in studies while males die earlier from these morbidities and leave healthier male counterparts in the study, which makes it appear that they have lower morbidity than females. However, in a systematic review encompassing over 37,000 adults from developed and developing countries, this confounder appeared to be discredited since females experienced higher frailty index scores (used as a surrogate to measure morbidity) than males for any age group.

== See also ==
- Health equity#Sex and gender in healthcare equity
- Homicide statistics by gender
- Mental disorders and gender
- Gender differences in suicide
- Sex differences in medicine
- Frailty syndrome
