= Undertreatment of pain =

Absence of pain management therapy

Undertreatment of pain is the absence of pain management therapy for a person in pain when treatment is indicated.

Consensus in evidence-based medicine and the recommendations of medical specialty organizations establish the guidelines which determine the treatment for pain which health care providers ought to offer. For various social reasons, persons in pain may not seek or may not be able to access treatment for their pain. At the same time, health care providers may not provide the treatment which authorities recommend.

== History ==
In 1961 the Single Convention on Narcotic Drugs established that certain drugs are "indispensable for the relief of pain and suffering" and that states should make them available to people who need them.

In 2009, a WHO report noted that accessing treatment for pain was difficult for many people in many places in the world for a range of reasons.

In 2010 the Commission on Narcotic Drugs and adopted a resolution on access to pain treatments. Also in 2010 the United Nations Office on Drugs and Crime published a feature explaining the problem of lack of access to pain treatment and expressing interest in the topic. In 2011 the International Narcotics Control Board published a supplement to its annual report which highlighted the issue as a concern to be addressed.

== Classification ==
When pain is a symptom of a disease, then treatment may focus on addressing the cause of the disease. Because of the hope that treatment which ends the disease would eliminate the pain, sometimes pain management is not recognized as a priority in favor of efforts to address an underlying cause of the pain.

In other cases, the pain itself might need its own treatment plan. Palliative care could be used to address the pain as its own priority. Palliative care might be used either with or alongside any treatment for an underlying condition.

== Signs and symptoms ==
Some organizations advise that health care providers treat pain whenever it is present. The perspective is that when a person complains of serious pain, then that person is in need of treatment.

Various publications offer guidance on recognizing pain and advising when a person with pain needs additional treatment.

== Causes ==
This phenomenon can be associated with a multitude of causes. Firstly, the biomedical model of disease, focused on pathophysiology rather than quality of life, reinforces entrenched attitudes that marginalize pain management as a priority. Other reasons may have to do with inadequate training, personal biases or fear of prescription drug abuse. For example, physicians may fear of being accused of overprescribing (see for instance the case of Dr William Hurwitz), despite the relative rarity of prosecutions, or physicians' poor understanding of the health risks attached to opioid prescription. A complicated history of politics also influences practices in the treatment of pain. This includes cultural, societal, religious, and political attitudes. These factors often disadvantage certain groups, such as the above populations, in seeking treatment for pain.

Undertreatment of pain may also be caused by biases among healthcare practitioners. These biases are both gender and race-based, meaning they are compounded for women of color. Gender based biases include the belief that women are overdramatic and emotional, so they exaggerate any pain they feel. For racial biases, there's a common belief that people of color experience less pain overall than white people. The intersection of gender and racial biases regarding pain leads to the unique "Strong Black Woman" stereotype in which Black women are perceived to both experience less pain than white women while also overexaggerating any pain that they do feel.

== Affected populations ==
Undertreatment of pain is common and is experienced by all age groups, from neonates to the elderly. In September 2008, the World Health Organization (WHO) estimated that approximately 80 percent of the world population has either no or insufficient access to treatment for moderate to severe pain. Every year, tens of millions of people globally, including around four million cancer patients and 0.8 million HIV/AIDS patients, suffer from lack of pain relief as part of their end-of-life treatment. Yet the medications to treat pain are cheap, safe, effective, and generally straightforward to administer, and international law obliges countries to make adequate pain medications available.

In addition, there are multiple demographics, namely elders, non-white racial minorities, and women, which suffer from undertreatment at disproportionate rates relative to their younger, non-Hispanic white male peers.

Pain, particularly chronic pain, is understood via a constellation of factors, specifically pathopsychology, cognitive, affective, behavioral and sociocultural factors. As such, the adequate treatment of pain requires a multidisciplinary approach that accounts for how chronic pain is experienced differently among patients of differing cultures and ethnicities.

Some pain patients are made invisible through the limited representation of people of color in clinical research, the marketing of analgesics, and biases among healthcare practitioners leading their pain to be ignored. While decades of pain research have neither produced a clear and consistent pattern of sex difference in human pain tolerance, nor substantiated "fantastical" claims about racialized pain tolerance, biases within the medical sphere persist in ways which disenfranchise minoritized patients causing the undertreatment of pain.

=== Age ===
Undertreatment in the elderly can be due to a variety of reasons including the misconception that pain is a normal part of aging, therefore it is unrealistic to expect older adults to be pain free. Other misconceptions surrounding pain and older adults are that older adults have decreased pain sensitivity, especially if they have a cognitive dysfunction such as dementia and that opioids should not be administered to older adults as they are too dangerous. However, with appropriate assessment and careful administration and monitoring older adults can have to same level of pain management as any other population of care.

However, as a result of two recent cases in California where physicians who failed to provide adequate pain relief were successfully sued for elder abuse, the North American medical and health care communities appear to be undergoing a shift in perspective. The California Medical Board publicly reprimanded the physician in the second case; the federal Center for Medicare and Medicaid Services has declared a willingness to charge with fraud health care providers who accept payment for providing adequate pain relief while failing to do so; and clinical practice guidelines and standards are evolving into clear, unambiguous statements on acceptable pain management, so health care providers, in California at least, can no longer avoid culpability by claiming that poor or no pain relief meets community standards.

=== Race ===
Literature examining the medical field indicates disparities in pain care for racial and ethnic minorities. Compared to Caucasian patients, African American and Hispanic patients are particularly at risk for being undertreated for pain. There are a variety of conditions for which African Americans and other racial and ethnic minorities experience continuous undertreatment, including cancer pain, acute postoperative pain, chest pain, acute pain, and chronic low back pain. Research demonstrates that even when controlling for age, gender, and pain intensity, racial and ethnic minorities are frequently subjected to insufficient treatment for acute and chronic pain when compared to non-Hispanic whites. A study examining over 1300 non-minority and minority patients discovered that those at facilities with principally minority patients were three times more likely to be undermedicated than patients treated in non-minority facilities. Furthermore, a follow-up study that investigated pain treatment in minority patients with recurrent or metastatic cancer found that 74% of Latinx and 59% of African American patients experiencing pain were not given the adequate analgesics. Minority patients, when compared to non-minority patients, were not as likely to be appropriately evaluated for their pain and reported less pain relief. Although the prescription of opioid analgesics in response to pain-related visits grew from 1993 to 2005, disparities in prescribing to racial and ethnic minorities persisted. White patients experiencing pain were considerably more likely to be prescribed an opioid analgesic when compared to Black, Hispanic or Asian patients. Specifically, 40% of white patients were prescribed opioid analgesics in 2005, while only 32% of nonwhite patients experiencing pain were prescribed them.

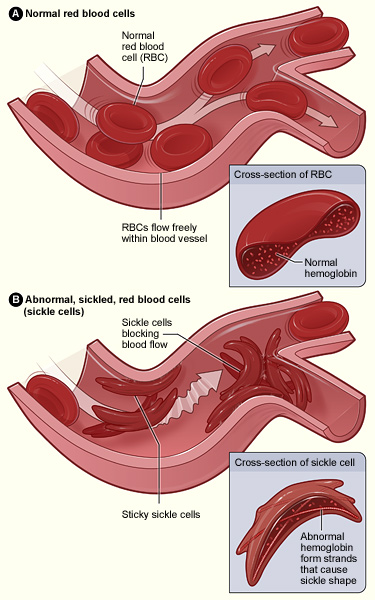

==== Sickle cell disease ====
Around 100,000 Americans are affected by sickle cell disease (SCD), the majority of whom are of African or Hispanic descent, and half of the adults with SCD don't survive past their early-40s. A characteristic feature of SCD is pain crises, or episodes of pain, which can vary in frequency and severity among individuals; sickle cell pain can be a sign of a lack of oxygen delivery to vital organs (vaso-occlusive crisis), which can lead to organ damage and death. Pain itself can exacerbate the severity of the disease as it causes blood vessels to constrict and further prevents proper oxygen circulation in the body.

Disparities in access to treatment and quality of care affect those with SCD, particularly treatment for pain relief. Sickle cell patients often face delayed care in emergency rooms, with patients at one hospital found to have 60% longer wait times to get pain medication compared to those with less severe symptoms of pain. Inadequate training of doctors and nurses to treat SCD is another contributing factor to undertreated pain in this population of patients: medical schools often offer very little sickle cell education, resulting in physicians who don't know how to properly care for sickle cell patients. In a survey of 3,000 family physicians, only 20% claimed they felt confident in treating the disease, meaning many cannot provide appropriate routine care for individuals with SCD. Furthermore, access to specialists and SCD treatment centers is difficult for many patients. Health insurance policies may prevent patients from seeing the specialists equipped to deliver quality care for SCD, and hematologists and treatment centers who specialize in SCD are scarce in general, adding a further barrier for patients to find care within an accessible distance.

Racial stereotyping and the opioid crisis have made physicians more hesitant to give opioid medication to sickle cell patients presenting with pain. Those in acute sickle crises are often seen as drug seeking because many doctors are trained to look out for the following behaviors: asking for a specific opioid medication, returning many times for the same issue, having complaints that are "out of proportion," and seeking treatment at a hospital. Sickle cell patients often are very familiar with their treatment plans and which medications work for them; yet, doctors are also often suspicious of patients who know too much about the pain medications they need. Furthermore, SCD patients usually require higher doses as they build tolerance towards the drug, making doctors who aren't familiar with the case even more unlikely to trust the patient and provide necessary care. Overall, however, there is not a lot of evidence showing particularly high rates of addiction among sickle cell patients: one study found stable opioid use among SCD patients over time while rates of use and addiction have increased in America. Nevertheless, practices have been put in place to prevent opioid dependence among sickle cell patients: rather than giving injections of hydromorphone, many hospitals have instituted a new protocol that delivers hydromorphone in a diluted form using IV drips; the slower medication delivery leaves SCD patients experiencing severe crises still in pain.

Hydroxyurea, originally to treat cancer, is an oral drug that can also effectively and safely reduce pain crises in sickle cell patients by increasing quantities of normal red blood cells, yet it's often underprescribed and underutilized; reasons include barriers to obtaining refills, need for management and follow up visits, and side effects, including reduction in white blood cells. Fewer than 25% of adult patients who need hydroxyurea to prevent pain crises actually are able to receive it outside the hospital.

=== Gender ===
==== History and background ====
There are disparities in the quality of healthcare between sexes and genders, and because pain is one of the most common reasons for people to seek healthcare, accessibility dictates whether one receives necessary treatment. Research shows that there are biological differences in the experience of pain both along biological sex lines and along gender identity lines. Under treatment of pain correlates to socially constructed gendered expectations built throughout centuries. The Yellow Wallpaper is the most famous narrative of a woman being treated for hysteria, an ethically problematic diagnosis that was the precursor or introduction to the concept of mental health and its physical symptoms. It is an example of how femininity is medicalized to perpetuate gendered identities.This novel evokes the concept of hysteria, a term which was used to refer to women's mental health issues in which they were assigned the narrative of being dramatic, exaggerative, and emotional. There is also evidence to support that social expectations about the expression of pain can dictate patient and doctor responses, linking the treatment of pain to social stereotypes. The way humans are socialized explains why women are assumed to be dramatic because men are taught to silence their pain and their capacity to express themselves has been muted. The University of Gothenburg conducted a study which found that women's pain is evaluated on comparison to men due to the gender-norms which label men as unemotional and women as "hysteric". The consequences of this perception is the assumption that women are either imagining or exaggerating their pain, so that they don't receive the care they need which is a sentiment that still exists today and plays into why women are undertreated for their pain.

==== Treatment disparities ====
Research shows that women are much more likely than men to be prescribed sedatives instead of pain medication. Doctor Calderone found that male patients that underwent coronary artery bypass grafts received narcotics more readily than females, and the female patients received sedative agents more often, hinting at anxiety being the root of their problems instead of pain. Additionally, women are 13 to 25 percent less likely than men to receive strong "opioid" pain medication. Even today women are more likely than men to be gaslit that the pain they are experiencing is all in their head. Women who were emitted to the emergency room with severe stomach pain had to wait 33% longer than men with the same symptoms. Females are also expected to endure more pain as a result of their biological processes, like giving birth and the effects of their menstrual cycle, in addition to the pain that comes with injury, illness, disease, that men experience aside from biological processes. The female experience of having to differentiate between normal biological pain and outside pain (illness, disease, etc.) is an experience unique to women which is why they are most often gaslit into believing the pain from injury, illness or disease comes from the processes and the pain they are expected to tolerated associated with birthing and menstrual cycles.

==== Under-representation of women in studies ====
Medical knowledge is collected through studies on biologically male bodies which raises concerns of applicability of this knowledge to biologically female bodies. Historically, women have been underrepresented in clinical studies, meaning that their experience of pain and their reaction to various medications is less understood.

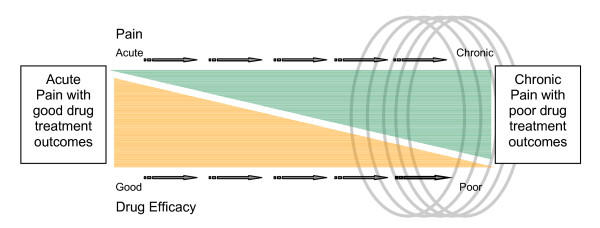

==== Chronic pain ====
Additionally, chronic pain, and conditions of chronic pain, are more common in women, but the rates of chronic pain and the differences in experience between men and women are not well documented. Chronic pain in women may also be attributed to reproductive issues like polyendocrine metabolic ovarian syndrome (PMOS), endometriosis, menopause, dysmenorrhea, even when these are not related to the pain women are experiencing.

== Epidemiology ==
=== United States ===
In the U.S., historical and ongoing racism against nonwhites has led to the undertreatment of pain for minorities. Research review by the National Academy of Medicine has recorded persistent qualitative discrepancies between the medical care provided to racial minorities. In its publication Unequal Treatment: Confronting Racial and Ethnic Disparities in Healthcare, researchers cite cultural barriers, distrust of the healthcare system by racial minorities, and racial stereotyping. In the case of cultural barriers, physicians and their patients may lack the tools to communicate effectively because of language barriers and other differences. Many minority individuals may not trust their doctors due to past and current unethical medical practices, such as experiments performed on slaves, the Tuskegee Syphilis Study, and the forced sterilization of Native American women, African Americans, and potentially, current immigrants in ICE detention centers. They therefore avoid care or do not fully participate in treatment plans. Furthermore, healthcare providers, who are typically white, may also empathize more with patients of their own race than with others.

=== Europe ===
Research conducted in Europe for the Journal of Pain & Palliative Care Pharmacotherapy has found that undertreatment of chronic pain in patients is widespread and is tied to legislative controls that regulate opioid prescription, which in turn creates fear of prescribing in providers. Patients are also hesitant to take opioids due to fear of dependency.

=== India ===
A case study published in the Journal of Pain Research revealed that in India, standardized pain management plans, which are designed to prevent pain mismanagement, are often not followed by doctors. Many physicians cited fear of addiction or dependence as a reason for their hesitancy to prescribe opioids, even when indicated. In addition, they found that several other cultural factors influenced the patient's adherence to pain plans. These included fear of opioid dependence, fear of questioning authority, and the cultural belief that suffering is a part of illness and therefore should be faced with stoicism.

The article also noted that similarly to the United States, several specific populations were found to have more issues with undertreatment of pain, including children, the elderly, and those with renal or hepatic dysfunction. Concerns with the elderly are often due to the prevalence of multiple comorbidities that make pain difficult to manage. Children often have communication barriers and neonates may be assumed not to feel pain. Many drugs are activated and excreted through the liver or kidney, so when there is hepatic or renal illness, pain medication dosing needs to be adjusted in a way that isn't always standardized.

=== Latin America ===
Similar to the United States and India, fear of prescribing opioids is a main reason cited for ineffective pain management in Latin America. A study in Pain Management notes that there is an overuse of nonopioid analgesics in Latin America due to this hesitancy that can be traced back to lack of training of physicians and health care providers. Other barriers to access include limited access to healthcare. Undertreatment of pain is widespread due to both the lack of access to opioids, which results in moderate to severe pain being managed with non-opioid analgesics that are not as effective, and fear of prescribing opioids when available. However there is also evidence that the reluctance to use opioids in latin america served as a protective factor against the opioid crisis

== Consequences ==
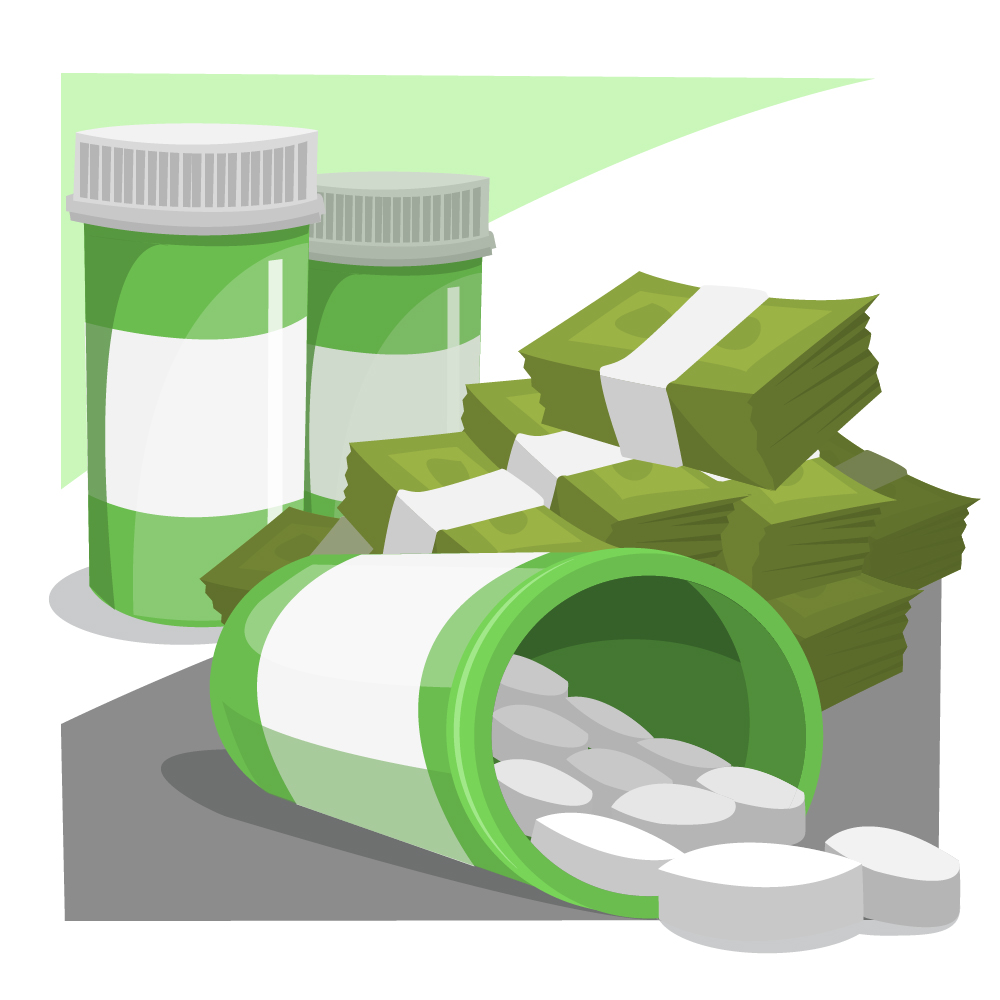
Health care and pharmaceutical drugs such as pain medications are costly

Inadequate pain management can leave several lasting impacts on individuals, such as a decreased quality of life (QOL). Higher pain severity has been found to be associated with lower self-reported evaluations of mental and physical wellness, negatively affecting a wide range of QOL components, including sleep, mood, mobility and physical functioning, sexual relationships, and social life. Individuals with chronic pain are more likely to have psychiatric illnesses, such as depression, anxiety, and post-traumatic stress disorder.

Lack of postsurgical pain relief leads to higher healthcare costs as recovery time and hospital stays are prolonged. Undertreatment of symptoms of pain in sickle cell patients, for instance, can give rise to millions of dollars per year directed towards more frequent emergency room visits, hospitalizations, as well as the costly effects of lost work productivity. The timely and appropriate treatment of pain, thus, can reduce economic burdens and, because pain is one of the primary reasons for hospital readmissions, significantly lower the prevalence of patients who need to return for more care.

Undertreated acute pain may also have more lasting physiological consequences and further contribute to healthcare spending that's avoidable. Severe pain can interfere with a patient's respiratory and cardiovascular physiology with increased risks of respiratory infection, myocardial ischemia, infarct or cardiac failure, and thromboembolic disease, impeding the patient's ability to recover and be discharged. Studies on patients hospitalized for issues ranging from childbirth to burn injuries to breast surgery to other serious illnesses have also all pointed to more intense acute pain levels being a risk factor for the development of chronic pain; the evidence indicates that insufficient treatment of acute pain doesn't only have temporary consequences for patients, but potentially also a decreased QOL for the rest of the patient's life. Acute pain, without appropriate management, can lead to chronic pain through immunological and neurological changes.

== Prevention and screening ==
Current strategies for improvement in pain management include framing it as an ethical issue; promoting pain management as a legal right; providing constitutional guarantees and statutory regulations that span negligence law, criminal law, and elder abuse; defining pain management as a fundamental human right; categorizing failure to provide pain management as professional misconduct, and issuing guidelines and standards of practice by professional bodies.

== See also ==
- Medical gaslighting
- Patient advocacy
