= Homicide statistics by gender =

At a global level, men represent both the majority of victims and the majority of perpetrators of homicide. According to the 2023 UNODC Global Study on Homicide, in 2021, at a global level, 81% of homicide victims were men. In 2021, males accounted for most homicide victims in all jurisdictions except in Austria, the Czech Republic, Iceland, Latvia, Norway, Slovenia and Switzerland, where females were slightly more likely to be homicide victims. The global homicide rate was 9.3 per 100,000 males and 2.2 per 100,000 females; and 90% of homicide suspects brought into formal contact with the police were men. According to the most recent data from World Bank Group, the highest rate per 100,000 inhabitants for female homicide victims is in Central African Republic, Antigua and Barbuda and Jamaica, and the highest rate per 100,000 inhabitants for male homicide victims is in US Virgin Islands, Jamaica and Venezuela. In 2020, the average percentage of women as homicide victims among European Union countries was 37%, with Latvia having the largest percentage of women homicide victims at 60%.

The pattern of males constituting both the majority of perpetrators and of victims has been also observed in studies recording lethal violence in chimpanzees.

Female homicide rate

Male homicide rate

== Statistics ==
The below table shows the reported annual homicide rate by sex per 100,000 inhabitants according to United Nations Office on Drugs and Crime (UNODC).

Country	Male victims per 100,000	Female victims per 100,000	Male–Female Ratio	Year
Albania	3.12	0.43	7.3	2024
Algeria	2.26	0.47	4.8	2024
Antigua and Barbuda	22.4	4.07	5.5	2024
Argentina	6.57	1.35	4.9	2024
Armenia	3.84	0.75	5.1	2024
Australia	1.2	0.66	1.8	2024
Austria	1.05	0.93	1.1	2024
Azerbaijan	2.78	1.23	2.3	2024
Bahamas	57.41	4.77	12.0	2024
Bahrain	0.11	0.34	0.3	2022
Barbados	14.77	0.68	21.7	2024
Belarus	2.11	1.03	2.0	2024
Belgium	2.0	0.19	10.7	2021
Belize	51.25	4.5	11.4	2022
Bhutan	3.39	1.4	2.4	2020
Bolivia	4.65	2.28	2.0	2024
Bosnia and Herzegovina	1.26	0.72	1.7	2024
Botswana	15.68	10.3	1.5	2023
Brazil	34.6	3.29	10.5	2024
British Virgin Islands	8.21	8.12	1.0	2006
Bulgaria	1.93	0.46	4.2	2024
Burundi	9.18	2.17	4.2	2016
Cabo Verde	10.31	3.56	2.9	2020
Cameroon	6.9	2.29	3.0	2022
Canada	2.74	1.2	2.3	2024
Chile	10.88	1.36	8.0	2024
Saint Lucia	78.88	3.3	23.9	2024
Colombia	45.89	3.35	13.7	2024
Costa Rica	31.52	3.04	10.4	2024
Croatia	1.07	0.95	1.1	2024
Cuba	7.12	1.86	3.8	2019
Curaçao	32.62	3.61	9.0	2007
Cyprus	1.17	0.74	1.6	2024
Czech Republic	0.6	0.62	1.0	2024
Denmark	1.31	0.37	3.6	2024
Dominica	27.19	9.06	3.0	2024
Dominican Republic	16.12	2.19	7.4	2024
Thailand	6.5	1.13	5.7	2014
Ecuador	71.98	5.73	12.6	2024
Egypt	4.13	0.57	7.3	2024
El Salvador	14.25	2.15	6.6	2024
England and Wales	1.37	0.51	2.7	2023
Estonia	2.94	0.7	4.2	2024
Eswatini	20.32	4.11	4.9	2024
Fiji	3.04	1.5	2.0	2024
Finland	1.16	0.71	1.6	2023
France	1.99	0.7	2.8	2024
French Guiana	21.44	4.69	4.6	2020
Georgia	3.96	1.18	3.3	2020
Germany	1.06	0.79	1.3	2024
Ghana	2.69	0.97	2.8	2022
Greece	1.23	0.48	2.6	2024
Grenada	25.53	1.71	14.9	2023
Guadeloupe	16.04	2.47	6.5	2016
Guatemala	38.95	6.25	6.2	2024
Guyana	25.46	3.28	7.8	2024
Haiti	113.73	14.91	7.6	2024
Honduras	43.05	4.45	9.7	2024
Hong Kong	0.45	0.32	1.4	2023
Hungary	0.93	0.5	1.9	2024
Iceland	1.49	2.6	0.6	2024
India	3.14	2.26	1.4	2023
Indonesia	0.57	0.2	2.9	2024
Iran	4.12	0.56	7.3	2014
Iraq (Central)	29.13	1.35	21.6	2021
Ireland	1.19	0.23	5.3	2024
Israel	5.28	0.74	7.1	2024
Italy	0.75	0.39	1.9	2024
Jamaica	75.79	5.71	13.3	2024
Japan	0.2	0.25	0.8	2024
Jordan	1.19	0.46	2.6	2024
Kazakhstan	3.75	1.41	2.7	2022
Kenya	6.74	2.59	2.6	2024
Kosovo	3.5	0.34	10.3	2021
Kuwait	1.08	1.05	1.0	2022
Latvia	3.11	2.29	1.4	2024
Lebanon	5.6	0.98	5.7	2024
Lesotho	39.16	6.09	6.4	2024
Lithuania	4.0	1.46	2.7	2024
Luxembourg	1.52	1.54	1.0	2022
Malaysia	1.02	0.32	3.1	2024
Malta	1.07	0.77	1.4	2024
Martinique	4.31	1.4	3.1	2009
Mauritius	3.94	1.41	2.8	2024
Mexico	46.4	5.55	8.4	2024
Micronesia	0.0	1.81	0.0	2019
Moldova	2.65	1.46	1.8	2024
Mongolia	8.66	2.64	3.3	2024
Montenegro	3.58	1.51	2.4	2024
Montserrat	0.0	43.14	0.0	2018
Morocco	2.85	0.47	6.1	2024
Myanmar	6.67	1.15	5.8	2022
Namibia	16.48	6.18	2.7	2021
Netherlands	0.84	0.48	1.7	2024
New Zealand	1.81	1.12	1.6	2022
Nicaragua	9.86	1.76	5.6	2023
Nigeria	24.4	6.53	3.7	2023
North Macedonia	2.03	0.53	3.8	2024
Norway	0.64	0.76	0.8	2024
Oman	0.16	0.1	1.5	2023
Palestine	2.54	0.26	9.7	2024
Panama	23.34	2.13	11.0	2024
Paraguay	12.03	1.71	7.0	2024
Peru	13.13	3.99	3.3	2021
Philippines	7.48	1.16	6.4	2024
Poland	0.91	0.44	2.0	2024
Portugal	1.05	0.46	2.3	2024
Puerto Rico	28.63	3.26	8.8	2024
Qatar	0.0	0.98	0.0	2022
Romania	1.61	0.66	2.4	2024
Russia	13.8	2.64	5.2	2024
Réunion	2.29	1.33	1.7	2009
Saint Kitts and Nevis	111.49	12.29	9.1	2024
St. Vincent and Grenadines	91.73	8.1	11.3	2024
Samoa	11.43	0.97	11.7	2018
Northern Ireland	0.85	0.21	4.1	2023
Serbia	1.28	0.54	2.4	2024
Seychelles	24.17	5.06	4.8	2022
Singapore	0.13	0.21	0.6	2024
Slovakia	1.15	0.89	1.3	2024
Slovenia	0.94	0.47	2.0	2024
South Africa	76.15	12.33	6.2	2024
South Korea	0.49	0.49	1.0	2024
Spain	1.01	0.46	2.2	2024
Sri Lanka	4.54	2.15	2.1	2022
Suriname	6.31	2.2	2.9	2024
Sweden	1.29	0.44	3.0	2024
Switzerland	0.5	0.51	1.0	2024
Scotland	1.65	0.46	3.6	2023
Tajikistan	1.61	0.2	8.0	2020
Tanzania	4.95	1.68	2.9	2024
Tonga	3.91	1.84	2.1	2020
Trinidad and Tobago	77.81	6.03	12.9	2024
Tunisia	7.53	1.9	4.0	2020
Turkmenistan	1.64	0.41	4.0	2015
Turkey	3.73	1.1	3.4	2024
Uganda	14.93	2.81	5.3	2024
Ukraine	10.82	1.9	5.7	2021
United Arab Emirates	0.69	0.21	3.3	2023
United States Virgin Islands	100.12	3.68	27.2	2012
United States of America	8.94	2.55	3.5	2023
Uruguay	20.46	2.64	7.8	2024
Uzbekistan	1.74	1.05	1.6	2021
Vanuatu	0.0	0.68	0.0	2020
Venezuela	90.07	5.12	17.6	2023

== See also ==
- Crime statistics
- Gender differences in suicide
- Health survival paradox
- Life expectancy#Sex differences
  - List of countries by life expectancy
- Sentencing disparity
- Sex differences in crime
