= Cold pressor test =

- Purpose: measuring changes in blood pressure

The cold pressor test is a cardiovascular test performed by immersing the hand into an ice water container, usually for one minute, and measuring changes in blood pressure and heart rate. These changes relate to vascular response and pulse excitability. Some research suggests that the outcome of the cold pressor test can help to predict hypertension in patients; however other studies have failed to confirm this.

Other measures can also be obtained from the cold pressor such as pain threshold and pain tolerance. This is done by requiring a participant to place their hand in the cold pressor for as long as they can. Once pain is present, they let the researcher know. Once the pain is unbearable, the participant removes their hand. This provides a measure of threshold (first feeling pain) and tolerance (total time minus threshold). This method is the most frequently used application of the cold pressor task. Comparable in terms of pain elicitation is the hot water immersion test, the equivalent to the cold pressor using hot water. The hot water immersion test (HIT) is equally capable of triggering a pain response without the confounding of baroreflex activation.

== Physiology ==
Sensory afferent nerves trigger a systemic sympathetic activation leading to marked vasoconstriction. The result is an elevated pulse pressure (normal is 40mm Hg), due to catecholamine release. This increased pressure fills the ventricle to a greater extent, but stroke volume decreases due to an increase in afterload.
