= Pain tolerance =

Level of pain a person is able to tolerate

Pain tolerance is the maximum level of pain that a person is able to tolerate. Pain tolerance is distinct from pain threshold (the point at which pain begins to be felt). The perception of pain that goes in to pain tolerance has two major components. First is the biological component—the headache or skin prickling that activates pain receptors. Second is the brain's perception of pain—how much focus is spent paying attention to or ignoring the pain. The brain's perception of pain is a response to signals from pain receptors that sensed the pain in the first place.

== Factors ==
=== Sex ===
Clinical studies by the journal of Psychosomatic Medicine found that "men had higher pain thresholds and tolerances and lower pain ratings than women" when they are exposed to cold pressor pain. The study asked participants to submerge their hands in ice water (the cold pressor pain procedure) and told members of the experimental group (as opposed to the control group) that they would be compensated financially for keeping their hand submerged. Suggested explanations for this difference include, "men are more motivated to tolerate and suppress expressions of pain because of the masculine gender role, whereas the feminine gender role encourages pain expression and produces lower motivation to tolerate pain among women."

=== Passive or active support ===
A similar study published in the same books focused on the effects of having individuals perform the ice water procedure if they are accompanied by another participant. Their results revealed, "Participants in the active support and passive support conditions reported less pain than participants in the alone and interaction conditions, regardless of whether they were paired with a friend or stranger. These data suggest that the presence of an individual who provides passive or active support reduces experimental pain."

=== Age ===
Age and pain tolerance are relevant especially in the elderly because if their pain is detected too late, they run the risk of greater injury or delayed treatment of disease. However, current knowledge shows that pain tolerance does not show substantial change with age. Only pain threshold shows an effect: it increases with age.

=== Ethnicity ===
Although it is inconclusive whether pain tolerance differs by ethnicity, some studies have shown that non-Hispanic whites possess higher heat and cold pain tolerance when compared to African Americans and Hispanics.

=== Psychological factors ===
Patients with chronic mood disorders show an increased sensitivity to pain. This is not surprising because many of the brain pathways involved in depression are also involved in pain. These disorders weaken the cognitive aspect of pain and thus lower pain tolerance. These effects are worse in unipolar compared to bipolar disorders, although both perceive pain significantly worse than people without a mood disorder. The lowest pain tolerance was seen in participants that were currently experiencing a major depressive episode. Lower pain tolerance associated with depressive symptoms can increase thoughts of suicide.

=== Hand dominancy, or handedness ===
One way to measure pain is to have participants place their hand in ice cold water. Their pain tolerance can then be measured based on how long they are able to keep their hand submerged before taking it out. One study used this technique to compare pain tolerance in dominant and non-dominant hands. One finding was that dominant hands showed a higher pain tolerance than non-dominant hands. Right-handers could withstand pain longer in their right hand than their left hand while the opposite was true for left-handers.

=== Neonatal injury ===
Nociceptive pathways are pathways in the brain that send and receive pain signals and are responsible for how we perceive pain. They develop before a baby is born and continue to develop during the critical period of development. It was once thought that because infants' nociceptive pathways in the brain were still developing, they could not feel pain. However, infants can feel pain and infant surgeries providing early pain experiences can alter the brain's tolerance for pain later so by increasing number of A fibers and C fibers—two types of pain receptors—located in the area where injury occurred and by reducing pain tolerance in the areas where incision has occurred. This reduction in pain tolerance is seen in male rats even when they are adolescents. In those rats, the area of their brain where an incision was made as an infant remains hypersensitive to pain thereafter. This effect was not seen as prominently in female rats.

=== Association and disassociation ===
Association and disassociation are two cognitive strategies have been found to increase pain tolerance.

=== Bias in Pain Tolerance ===
Bias in pain tolerance is widespread in clinical practice and leads to underestimation and undertreatment of pain, especially in women and racial minorities. Oftentimes, these biases are rooted in biological misconceptions, stereotypes, unconscious beliefs, and errors in assessing pain. People tend to inaccurately assess pain. One study using videos of people in pain as stimuli found that observers disproportionately underestimated women of color's pain compared to white women, white men, and men of color. In addition, studies have shown that in general, women experience higher levels of post-operative pain, but receive less pain medication compared to men. Furthermore, bias has been shown in medical students on pain tolerance in a survey where many medical students were found to believe the false statement: "black people's skin is thicker than white people's." These instances of bias in pain tolerance have broader implications in healthcare including contributing to decreased trust in providers, long-term undertreatment of pain, and worse health outcomes, particularly for minorities groups.

== Conditioning ==
It is widely believed that regular exposure to painful stimuli will increase pain tolerance, increasing the ability of the individual to handle pain by becoming more conditioned to it. However, in some cases, there is evidence to support the theory that greater exposure to pain will result in more painful future exposures. Repeated exposure bombards pain synapses with repetitive input, increasing their responsiveness to later stimuli, through a process similar to learning. Therefore, although the individual may learn cognitive methods of coping with pain, such methods may not be sufficient to cope with the boosted response to future painful stimuli. A mouse model study on the role of protein kinase C gamma (PRKCG) in pain sensitization found that mice lacking the protein also lacked the neuropathic pain sensitization seen in normal animals.

Thus, trauma victims (or patients in pain) are given painkillers (such as morphine) as soon as possible to prevent pain sensitization.

Kalat suggests that morphine should be taken before surgery; "People who begin taking morphine before surgery need less of it afterward."

== See also ==
- Endurance game
