= Journal of Pain and Palliative Care Pharmacotherapy =

Journal of Pain & Palliative Care Pharmacotherapy
- Discipline: Pain, palliative care, pharmacotherapy
- Language: English
- Edited by: Arthur G. Lipman

Publication details
- Former names: Journal of Pharmaceutical Care in Pain & Symptom Control
- History: 1993-present
- Publisher: Informa Healthcare
- Frequency: Quarterly

Standard abbreviations
- ISO 4: J. Pain Palliat. Care Pharmacother.

Indexing
- ISSN: 1536-0288 (print); 1536-0539 (web)
- LCCN: 2001211724
- OCLC no.: 47283753

Links
- Journal homepage; Online access; Online archive

The Journal of Pain & Palliative Care Pharmacotherapy is a quarterly peer-reviewed medical journal covering advances in acute, chronic, and end-of-life symptom management. It is published by Informa Healthcare and the editor in chief is Arthur G. Lipman (University of Utah Health Sciences Center). The journal was established in 1993 as the Journal of Pharmaceutical Care in Pain & Symptom Control, obtaining its current title in 2001.

== Abstracting and indexing ==
The journal is abstracted and indexed in:

- Academic Search Premier
- EBSCO databases
- CINAHL
- Embase
- Index Medicus/MEDLINE/PubMed
- PsycINFO
- Scopus
- PASCAL
- Referativnyi Zhurnal
