= American Mustache Institute =

- Type: Mustache Advocacy
- Location: Pittsburgh, Pennsylvania

The American Mustache Institute (AMI) is an advocacy organization and registered 501(c)(3) not-for-profit originally based in St. Louis, Missouri. In 2013, it moved to Pittsburgh, Pennsylvania.

When founded in 1965, AMI was the only organization in the world working towards facial hair advocacy. AMI's full-time staff supports more than 700 global chapters, which advocate for greater acceptance of mustaches in the workplace and throughout modern culture.

== Discrimination ==
Efforts by AMI have included a 2007 campaign against "widespread and unacceptable discrimination in the workplace and society", as chronicled by media including The Daily Telegraph and The Learning Channel. In December 2007, AMI lobbied the Royse City, Texas School District on behalf of student Sebastian Pham, who had been forced by a teacher to shave his mustache, which in the opinion of Pham's family and AMI had violated his civil liberties. Additionally, The New York Times cited AMI as an example of modern online community building.

== Community work ==
Part of the organization's charter includes supporting communities in which it works, and therefore AMI created a charitable fundraising mechanism in 2006 for organizations such as Challenger Baseball, a baseball league for disabled children. AMI's first charitable fundraiser—'Stache Bash 2006 — was held in July 2006. The event raised awareness of the issue of mustache acceptance, supported mustachioed Americans, and raised funds for Challenger Baseball. The organization held its second ‘Stache Bash in 2007, and just prior USA Today wrote the event was part of AMI's efforts to "protect the rights of, and bias against, mustached Americans." As part of 'Stache Bash 2007, AMI also conducted voting for the “Greatest Sports Mustache” of all time, which was won in a popular vote by former Major League Baseball player Keith Hernandez as announced by AMI in August 2007. Ultimately, the event raised enough funds to allow Challenger Baseball to add six new teams for the 2008 campaign.

== Jason Giambi ==
On July 7, 2008, the American Mustache Institute endorsed professional baseball player Jason Giambi of the New York Yankees for All-Star candidacy in the hopes that it generate votes for Giambi, whom Aaron Perlut, Executive Director of AMI, has described as having "powerful lip fur" that attests to his "great intellect and good looks". This move sent a ripple through the blogosphere. The New York Yankees accepted and incorporated this endorsement into their already growing package supporting Giambi, and his mustache, climaxing in a stadium promotion, the first mustache giveaway in Yankee history, where the first 20,000 fans received a fake mustache in support of Giambi's.

== Robert Goulet ==
In September 2008, the AMI honored the late entertainer Robert Goulet in working with his spouse, Vera Goulet, to name an award in his honor, "The Robert Goulet Mustached American of the Year" award, recognizing the most influential Mustached American of the past year. On October 25, 2008, retired New York City policeman Timothy P. Galvin was named the winner of the first ever "Robert Goulet Memorial Mustached American of the Year".

== "Saving and Spending Patterns of Mustached Americans" ==
In October 2009, AMI and Quicken commissioned a study entitled “Saving And Spending Patterns of Mustached Americans”. The research study examined a random sample of 2,000 Mustached Americans, along with 2,000 bearded and 2,000 clean-shaven Americans and found that Mustached Americans earned 8.2 percent more on average than those with beards and 4.3 percent more than the clean-shaven. The research also demonstrated that people of Mustached American descent also tended to spend 11 percent more and save 3 percent less than their collective counterparts.

== Stache Act ==
AMI supports the proposal in the 'Stache Act, which calls for a tax deduction of up to $250 a year for facial hair grooming.

== 2013 Move to Pittsburgh ==
In 2013, the organization moved to Pittsburgh, the hometown of Adam Paul Causgrove, winner of the 2012 Robert Goulet Memorial Mustached American of the Year. The change in location was feted by a ceremony at Pittsburgh City-County Building hosted by Pittsburgh City Councilwoman Theresa Kail-Smith. During the ceremony, the city's "heritage of the sexually dynamic American mustache lifestyle" and the example set by mustachioed Pittsburgh luminaries as Andrew Carnegie, George Westinghouse, Willie Stargell and Rocky Bleier were celebrated. A $1.3 trillion economic windfall" for the city was predicted. The organization's annual 'Stache Bash, where the Robert Goulet Memorial Mustached American of the Year is awarded, will be held in Station Square, with local charity Step to Independence serving as the beneficiary.

== See also ==
- Moustache
- Movember
- Mustache March
- Tacheback
