= Killing of Dylan Noble =

2016 killing in Fresno, California

- Date: June 25, 2016; 10 years ago
- Location: Fresno, California, US
- Type: Police brutality, suicide by cop
- Participants: Raymond Camacho and Robert Chavez
- Deaths: Dylan Noble
- Charges: None

On June 25, 2016, two officers of the Fresno Police Department shot Dylan Noble, a 19-year-old man from Clovis, California, to death during a traffic stop in the east side of Fresno, California. The shooting sparked protests across Fresno and its metropolitan area.

== Killing ==
On June 25, 2016, Fresno officers Raymond Camacho and Robert Chavez, each of whom had been police for at least 17 years, were responding to a call made at 3:20 p.m. reporting a man with a rifle walking down the street. They initiated a traffic stop on a black pickup truck with a missing trunk door for reckless driving and speeding. Noble refused to pull over the vehicle, and the officers pursued the vehicle until reaching a gas station near the intersections of East Shields Avenue and North Armstrong Avenue in the east side of Fresno. After Noble parked his truck at the east side of the lot, one of the officers brandished his gun on the steering wheel, believing that Noble was armed with a weapon. One officer can be heard yelling to Noble, "Turn off the truck. Get your hands out the window. Both hands out the window." A second officer then shouted, "Let me see both your hands… Get both your hands out."

Noble exited the truck and approached the officers before he moved away from them. Officers gave thirty commands, urging Noble to show his hands, lift his hands or lie down on the ground. An officer immediately called for backup as Noble defied their orders. Noble carried an object in his right hand that officers believed was a weapon. Noble shouted, "I fucking hate my life!" before officers opened fire on Noble. Noble shouted "fuck it" as his last words. Camacho shot Noble twice, causing him to fall to the ground. He fired another round before Chavez fired 12 seconds later. Noble was taken to a nearby hospital, where he was pronounced dead three hours later. Officers found both alcohol and cocaine in the vehicle. The item in Noble's hand was determined to have been a "small plastic box". Noble was not in possession of any weapons at the time of the shooting.

== Protests and reactions ==
Dylan Noble's friends began nightly protests on June 25 at the Chevron gas station where Noble was shot. Several of Noble's friends held up White Lives Matter signs as an act of protest, while one person carried a Confederate flag. Noble's friends said the sign was meant to convey that his death deserved the same kind of outrage as police killings of young black men, with one saying, "Dylan's life mattered, and yes, he's white." Noble was invoked at larger, concurrent protests in Fresno about other local police shootings and the shootings of Alton Sterling and Philando Castile.

On July 13, the Fresno Police Department released graphic bodycam footage of the shooting.

Noble’s mother held weekly small demonstrations in front of the Fresno police headquarters. Noble's father expressed both deep disbelief and anger in an interview, saying "They're just trigger-happy" and "Nothing they do can bring my kid back ... but I want those cops to pay. I won't be satisfied until they go up on murder charges. They should be held [responsible] like anybody else who killed an innocent kid."

On July 14, amid criticism that she had not made a public statement about the shooting, Fresno's mayor Ashley Swearengin spoke on the phone to ABC affiliate KFSN-TV, saying "I still struggle to find the right words, because there's no way to capture, I think, the feelings that we're all having right now. I'm trying to walk through this as if I were in the shoes of law enforcement, the shoes of family, and I think like most Fresnans, it's just such a conflictive feeling."

== Investigation and settlement ==
Following an investigation, Fresno County District Attorney's Office announced in December 2016 that neither Camacho nor Chavez would face criminal charges. Then-police chief Jerry Dyer stated that while the initial shots were "objectively reasonable", the officers violated department policy regarding the final shot, pulled by Chavez, were fired while Noble was already on the ground. He noted that the threat had diminished and "other potential alternatives" should have been explored.

On July 11, 2016, Noble's mother filed a claim against the city. On August 3, an autopsy report confirmed that Noble had a blood alcohol content of 0.12, which is much higher than the legal limit of 0.01 for people underage. Toxicology also found traces of benzoylecgonine, the primary component of cocaine in his system.

On August 9, 2018, the city of Fresno agreed to pay Noble's father will $1.29 million, Noble's mother $1.49 million, and the estate $20,000.

== See also ==
- Killing of John Albers
- Killing of Christian Hall
- Killing of Tony Timpa
- List of killings by law enforcement officers in the United States, June 2016
- Shooting of Daniel Shaver
- Men's health
