= Movember =

Annual event to raise awareness of men's health problems

Movember Foundation
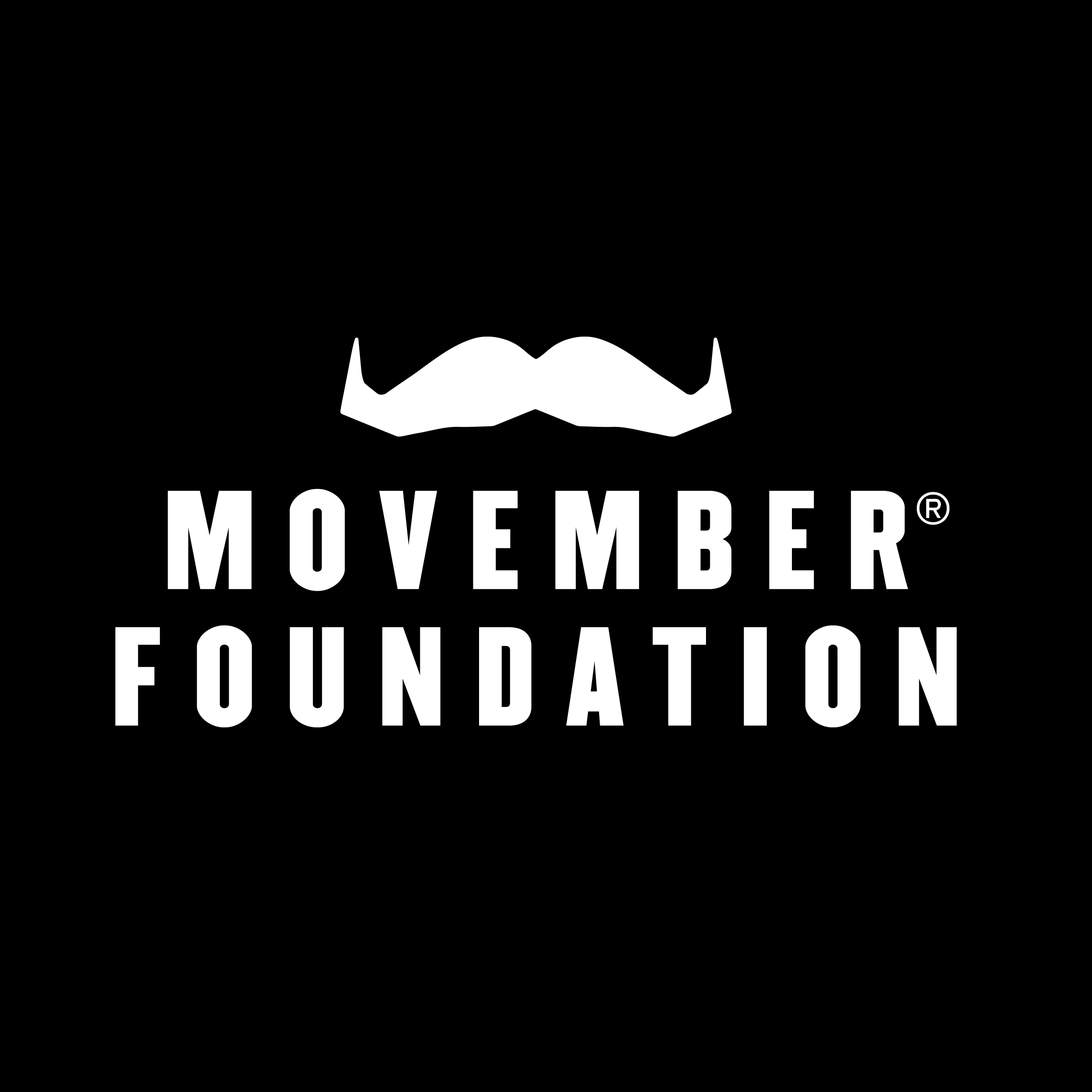
- Formation: 2003; 23 years ago
- Founders: Adam Garone; Travis Garone; Luke Slattery; Justin Coghlan
- Type: 501(c)(3) Charity
- Purpose: Helping men live happier, healthier, longer lives
- Headquarters: Melbourne, Australia
- Location(s): Los Angeles; London; Toronto
- Chairman: Damien Angus
- CEO: Andrew Little
- Website: www.movember.com

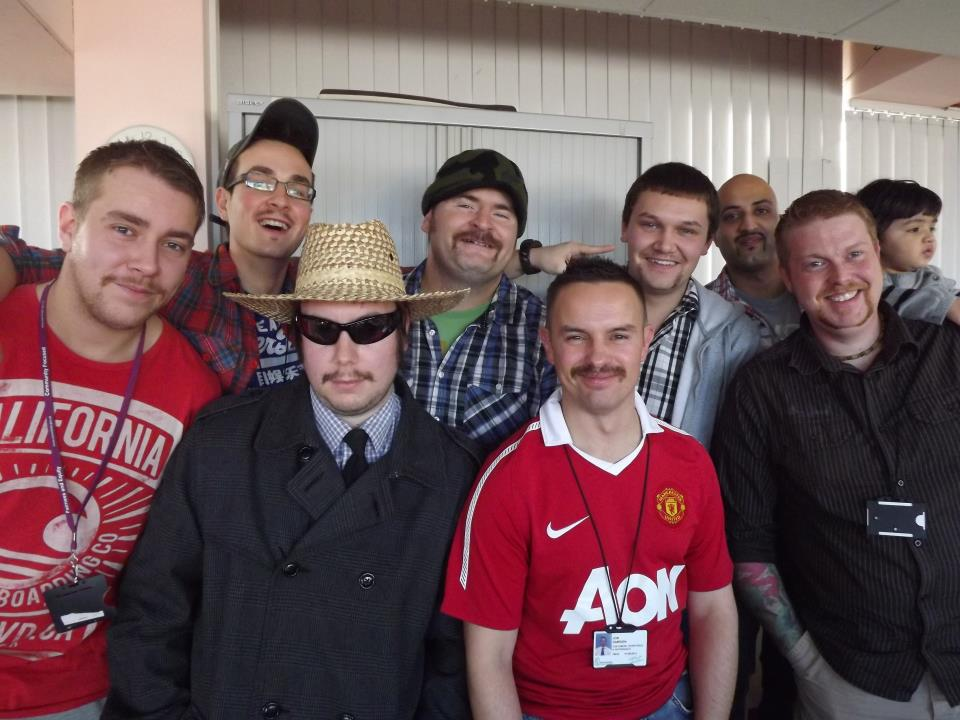
A group of men displaying moustaches for Movember

Movember is an annual event involving the growing of moustaches during the month of November to raise awareness of men's health issues, such as prostate cancer, testicular cancer, and men's suicide. It is a portmanteau of the Australian-English diminutive word for moustache, "mo", and "November". The Movember Foundation runs the Movember charity event, housed at Movember.com. The goal of Movember is to "change the face of men's health".

By encouraging men (whom the charity refers to as "Mo Bros") to get involved, Movember aims to increase early cancer detection, diagnosis and effective treatments, and ultimately reduce the number of preventable deaths. Besides annual check-ups, the Movember Foundation encourages men to be aware of family history of cancer and to adopt a healthier lifestyle. Using the moustache as the driving symbol of the movement, Movember focuses on the three key areas of prostate cancer, testicular cancer, and mental health and suicide prevention. Since inception, the Movember Foundation has raised more than $1.8 billion AUD and funded over 1,600 projects in more than 20 countries.

Since 2004, the Movember Foundation charity has run Movember events to raise awareness and funds for men's health issues, such as prostate cancer and depression, in Australia and New Zealand. In 2007, events were launched in Ireland, Canada, Czech Republic, Denmark, El Salvador, Spain, the United Kingdom, Israel, South Africa, Taiwan and the United States. As of 2011, Canadians were the largest contributors to the Movember charities of any nation. In 2010, Movember merged with the testicular cancer event Tacheback.

In 2012, the Global Journal listed Movember as one of the world's top 100 NGOs (non-government organizations).

== History ==
=== Origins ===
Seven Nightly News aired a story in 1999 including a group of young men in Adelaide, South Australia who coined the term "Movember" and the idea of growing moustaches for charity throughout the month of November. In the news report, members of the Adelaide-based "Movember Committee" explained how they came up with the idea for Movember one night in the pub. The group started with 80 men from Adelaide and soon became a nationwide phenomenon. They also aimed to raise money for the RSPCA through selling T-shirts in what they termed "Growing whiskers for whiskers".

In 2004, an unrelated group in Melbourne organised an event where 30 men would grow a moustache for 30 days in order to raise awareness for prostate cancer and depression in men. The movement was born when Adam Garone, Travis Garone, Luke Slattery, and Justin (JC) Coughlin inspired 26 other friends with a desire to "bring back" the trend of growing moustaches. The next year, nearly 500 people raised over $40,000 for the Prostate Cancer Foundation of Australia. At the time, it was the largest donation the PCFA had ever received. This group would later become the Movember Foundation charity. Three years after starting the Movember movement, the organization was granted official charity status in Australia.

The Movember Foundation has since raised $174-million worldwide, after spreading to South Africa and Europe, reaching North America in 2006. In 2009, Movember obtained official charity status in the United States. In 2010, participants in the United States alone raised over $7.5 million. In 2012, 1.1 million people signed up to participate, raising upwards of $95 million.

=== The Moscars ===
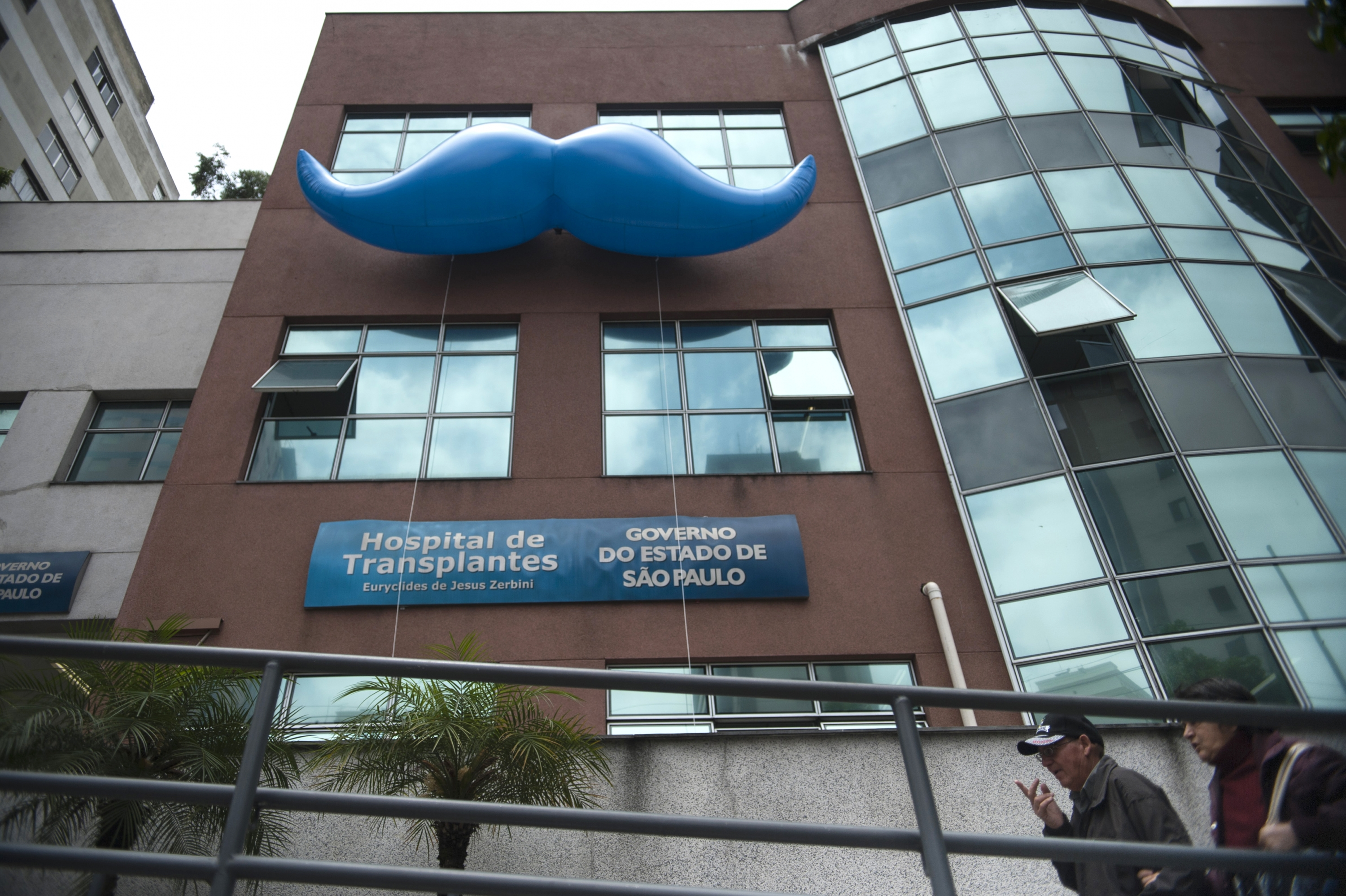
Public hospital in Brazil with an inflatable moustache in November 2013

The charity launched The Moscars in 2010, an online global user-submitted video contest that helps Movember participants showcase their involvement in the movement. Submissions cannot be longer than 4 minutes each, and prizes can be won in several categories.

In 2012, head judge Stan Lee awarded the Moscar to South Africa's comedy duo Derick Watts & The Sunday Blues for their video, "The Movember Song", a parody of Carly Rae Jepsen's hit "Call Me Maybe".

=== International Man of Movember ===
The International Man of Movember is chosen from 21 national winners all over the world to wear the crown and be the face of Movember for a whole year. Each national Man of Movember winner is voted in at that particular country's main Gala Parté, held at the end of November, by both judges and fans.

The first champion was Mark Knight from London in 2010. South Africa's Anton Taylor won the title in 2011, and in 2012 it was Chris Thwaites from New Zealand who won the coveted sash. 2013 saw Sweden's Tom Rickard crowned.

=== Criticism ===
A 2012 study published in The BMJ titled "Is Movember misleading men?" stated:

"Movember's emphasis on screening tests, its recommendation of a frequency of screening that is not based on evidence, and its failure to provide good supporting information place well intentioned men in unhelpful conflict with their doctors. Meanwhile, the far more pressing concerns of mental illness, alcohol and substance misuse, smoking, and obesity are pressed into near silence. Is this the best we can do for men's health?"

A 2015 study published in the Journal of Cancer Education stated:

"Findings from Twitter suggest that the Movember Canada 2013 did not meet the stated campaign objective of creating conversations about men's health and, specifically, about prostate and testicular cancers."

Another 2015 study published by Delft University of Technology stated:

"We find that across countries Twitter users mostly focus on the social aspect of the Movember campaign, with relatively few tweets focusing on the health aspect of Movember. Additionally, those users that do mention health related issues often use generic statements, instead of focusing on the two specific health issues that Movember aims to address (cancer and mental health). Surprisingly, the mental health aspect of Movember is virtually not discussed at all."

== Partners ==
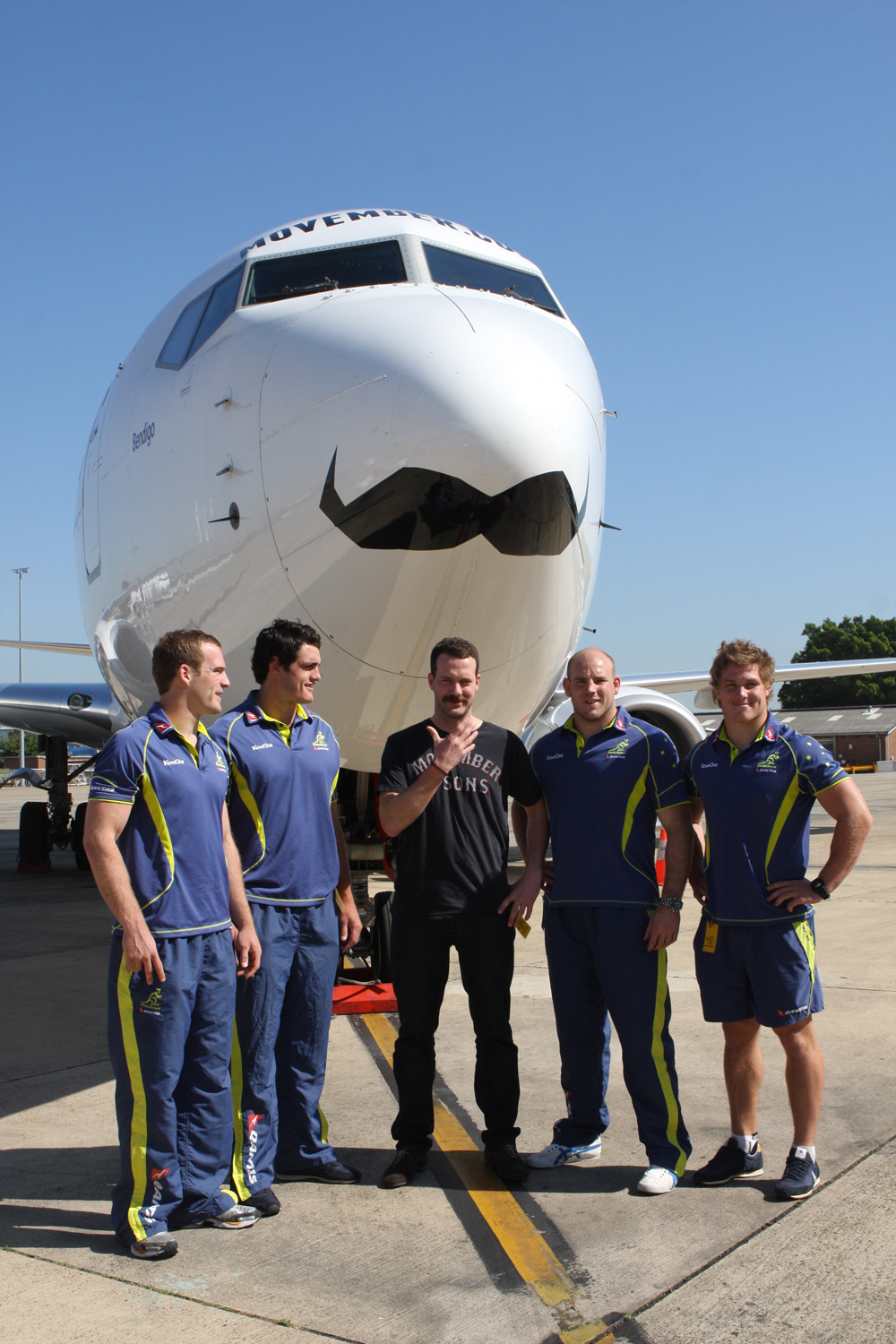
Members of the Australia national rugby union team at the unveiling of a promotionally decorated Boeing 737–800 aircraft, during Movember in 2011

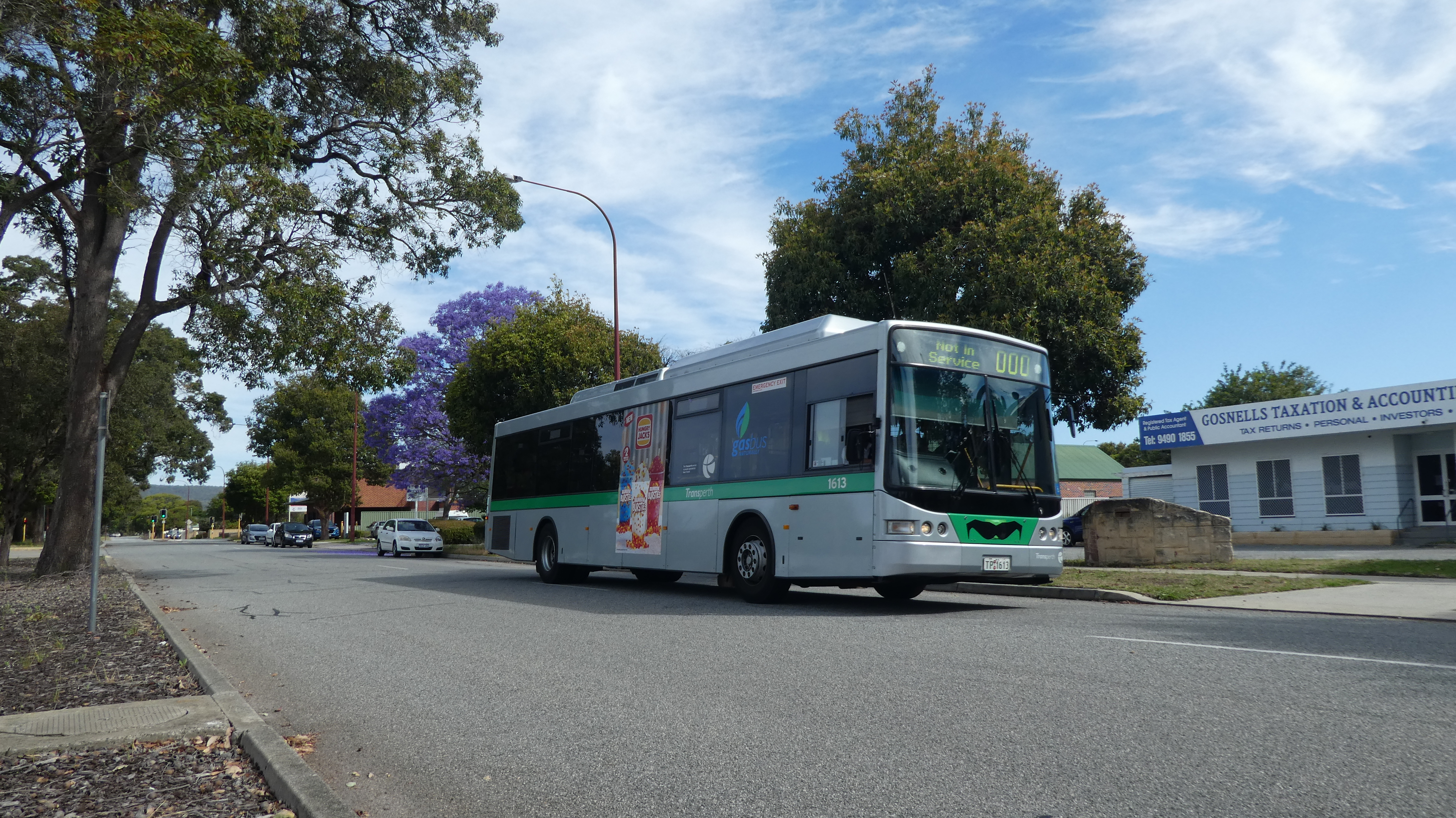
Transperth-owned Swan Transit supported Movember by promotionally decorating the front grille on some of their Transperth buses with a moustache decal.

In 2011, Google Chrome partnered with Movember to create a video. The video featured real participants, and how they utilize the web and Movember.com to raise awareness and funds for the cause. The video generated well over 1.1 million views. It featured the Handsome Furs song "Repatriated".

In 2010 and 2011, Movember partnered with TOMS to create limited edition Movember shoes for those participating.

In 2011, Qantas supported Movember by painting a moustache and "Movember.com" on one of its airplanes.

In 2011, the world's largest sandcastle Mo was built on Bondi Beach, in Sydney.

A 2012 Movember video featuring Parks and Recreation star Nick Offerman was one of the top 10 most watched charity videos of the year, with 1.9 million views. Offerman made additional sketches for Movember 2013.

Since 2012, Royal Mail has supported the Movember campaign and created a special postmark featuring a moustache.

In November 2013, the UK National Trust authorised the temporary placement of a huge grass moustache to the Cerne Abbas Giant, the UK's largest chalk hill figure. The moustache added to the 55-metre (180 ft) giant. was 12 metres (39 ft) wide and 3 metres (10 ft) deep according to the designer but both the National Trust and the BBC reported it as being 36 by 9 feet (11.0 by 2.7 m).

In 2015 Carlsberg Group beer brand made special Movember beer beauty accessories to look after mustaches and beard.

In 2020, Transit Systems–owned Swan Transit decorated the front grill on some of their Transperth buses with moustache decals.

In 2023, Pringles held Movember events and changed its iconic moustache into a QR code to promote conversations on mental health.

=== Charities ===
Since 2004, the Movember Foundation charity has used Movember to raise awareness and funds for men's health issues in Australia and New Zealand. Monetary proceeds go toward the Prostate Cancer Foundation of Australia, the Cancer Society and Mental Health Foundation of New Zealand, and Beyond Blue.

In 2007, the Foundation launched campaigns in Canada (funds raised go to the Prostate Cancer Research Foundation of Canada), Spain (FEFOC), the United Kingdom Prostate Cancer UK, and the United States (the Prostate Cancer Foundation and the Livestrong Foundation). In the US, Movember's men's health partners are The Prostate Cancer Foundation and LIVESTRONG.

In 2008, the Movember Foundation started the event in the Republic of Ireland. The beneficiary in that country is Action Prostate Cancer, an initiative of the Irish Cancer Society.

A non-foundation Movember event has been held in the Cayman Islands by a "MOvember Committee" since 2006. The event has been sponsored by CML Offshore Recruitment and raises funds for the Cayman Islands Cancer Society.

=== Video games ===
Players in Football Manager 2015 grow moustaches during the month of November.

FIFA 14 Ultimate Team featured a Movember Cup and FIFA 17 Ultimate Team featured a Movember player promotion.

Sony released a moustache sticker intended to be placed on the front of the DualShock 4 controller in support of Movember.

In November 2012, four Movember themed games were released as Google Chrome web apps.

Warframe promotes and supports Movember every November with in-game moustache cosmetics.

Asphalt Legends collaborated with Movember with a dedicated limited-time event featuring the Lamborghini Huracán STO and the Lamborghini Revuelto.

In November 2024, Isonzo released limited-time "Movember Handlebar" DLC as part of Movember charity promotion.

In November 2026, Wardogs released a cosmetic mustache for season 3

== Programs ==
The Movember Foundation has funded over 1,200 men's health projects globally, including:

- TrueNTH
- Nuts & Bolts (Previously TrueNTH Testicular Cancer)
- Making Connections
- Farmstrong
- Ahead of the Game
- IRONMAN
- PCF Challenge Awards

== Pop culture ==
Over the years, many athletes and celebrities have helped bring awareness to Movember, including Kevin Love, Valtteri Bottas and Jackie Lee.

== Similar events ==
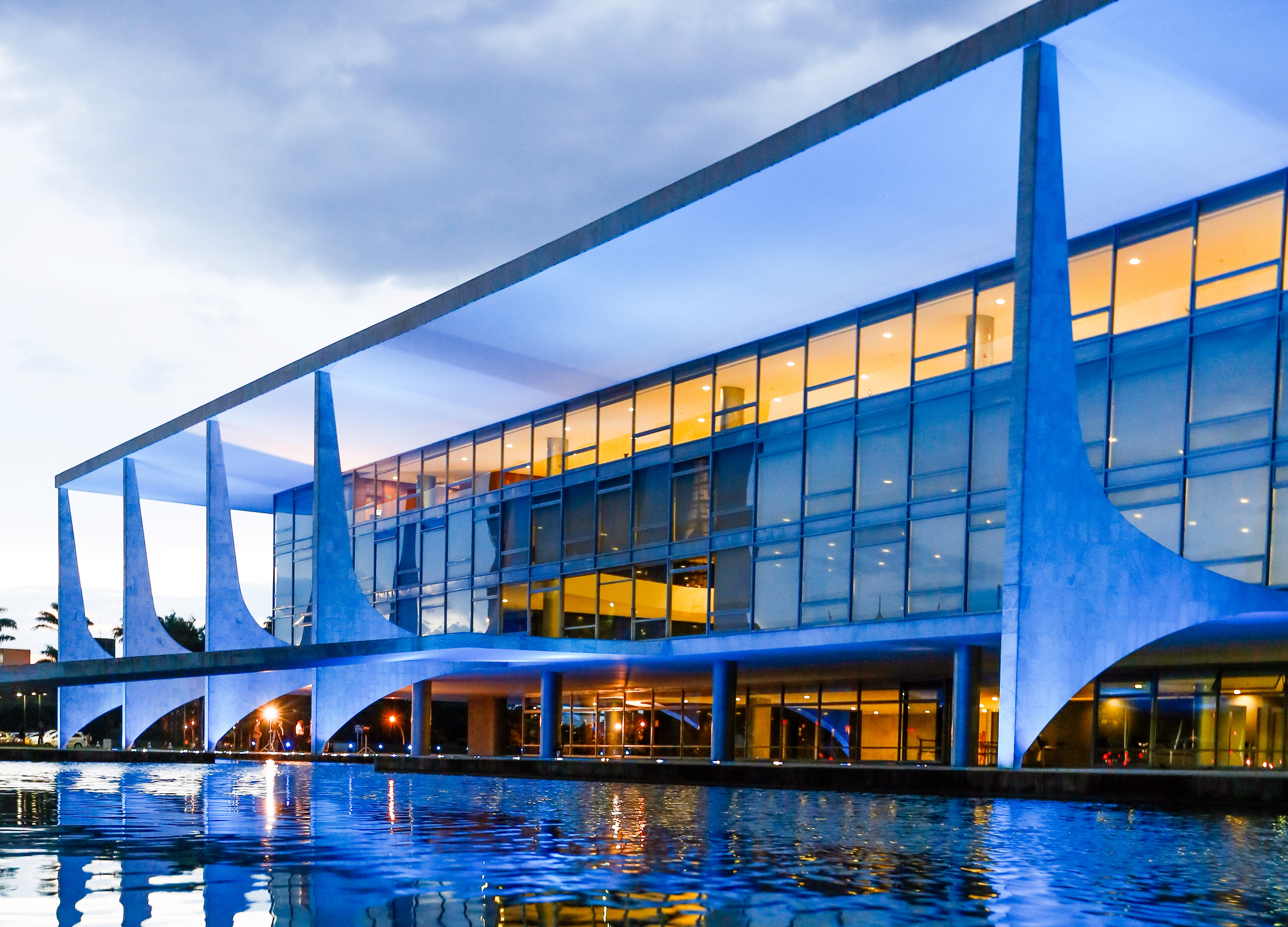
Palácio do Planalto, the office of the President of Brazil, lighted up for "Novembro Azul" (Blue November), one of the events during Movember.

- Since the Vietnam War era, United States Air Force members have participated in Mustache March, where Airmen grow moustaches in good-natured defiance of facial hair regulations during the month of March.
- In 2015, a Decembeard event promoted awareness of bowel cancer.

== See also ==
- Distinguished Gentleman's Ride – Global motorcycle fund-raising event
- HeadsUpGuys – Mental health organization in Canada
- International Men's Day (19 November)
- Men's health – Broad subject that encompasses all facets of men's health
- Miles for Men – Charity in the United Kingdom
- National Prostate Cancer Awareness Month – Annual health campaign

== General sources ==
- "What is Movember?" Article containing tips on raising more money for Movember. 26 March 2013
