= Craig Ferguson (charity walker) =

Scottish charity walker

- Born: 2003 or 2004 (age 22–23)
- Occupations: Charity walker, men's mental health activist, waiter

Craig Ferguson (born 2003/2004) is a Scottish charity walker, men's mental health activist and waiter.

In 2024, Ferguson helped spread awareness for men's mental health and suicide prevention for the charity organization Brothers In Arms, by walking 1,000 miles from Hampden Park in Glasgow to Germany, to attend the opening match of Germany and Scotland at the UEFA Euro 2024, raising over £78 thousand pounds for the awareness. According to BBC News, he was shortlisted for Fan of the Year by FIFA.

In 2026, Ferguson helped spread awareness for the charity organization Scottish Action for Mental Health, by walking 3,000 miles with a kilt from Santa Monica Pier in Santa Monica, California to Boston, Massachusetts, to attend the opening match of Scotland and Haiti at the 2026 FIFA World Cup, raising over £1 million pounds. His awareness by praised by Scotland’s prime minister John Swinney, who stated: “I have been hugely impressed by Craig's inspirational campaign to raise funds for SAMH, one of Scotland's leading mental health charities”.
