= Gender differences in suicide =

World map of male to female ratios of suicide rates, blue means more male suicides (2017, OWID)

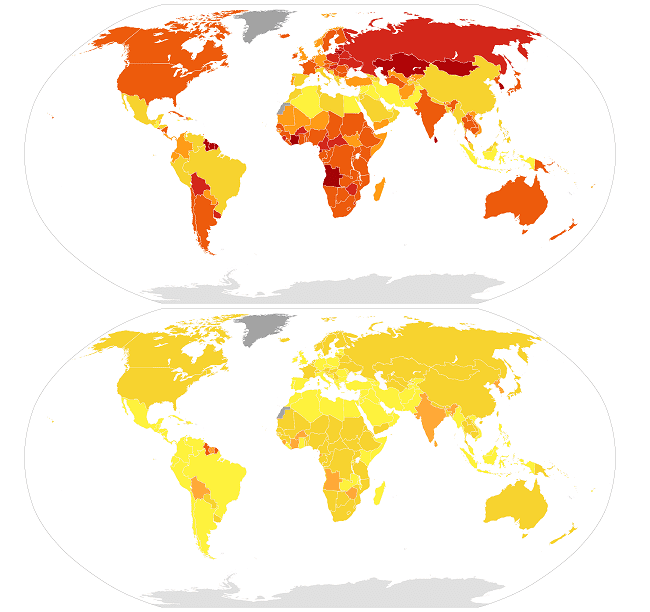
Age-standardized male (top) and female (bottom) suicide mortality rates per 100,000 (2015, WHO): 0–5 5–10 10–15 15–25 / 25–35 Above 35 No data

Gender differences in suicide include different rates of suicides and suicidal behavior between men and women, among both adults and adolescents. While women more often have suicidal thoughts, men die by suicide more frequently. This discrepancy is known as the gender paradox in suicide.

Globally, death by suicide occurred about 1.8 times more often among men than among women in 2008, and 1.7 times in 2015. In the Western world, men die by suicide three to four times more often than do women. This greater male frequency is increased in those over the age of 65. Suicide attempts are between two and four times more frequent among women. Researchers have partly attributed the difference between suicide and attempted suicide among the sexes to men using more lethal means to end their lives. Other reasons, including disparities in the strength or genuineness of suicidal thoughts, have also been given.

== Overview ==
The role that gender plays as a risk factor for suicide has been studied extensively. While women, particularly those under the age of 25, show higher rates of non-fatal suicidal behavior and suicide thoughts, and attempt suicide more frequently than men do, men have a much higher rate of suicide. This is known as the gender paradox in suicide, a term coined by Silvia Sara Canetto and Isaac Sakinofsky.

According to the World Health Organization (WHO), challenges represented by social stigma, the taboo to openly discuss suicide, and low availability of data are obstacles leading to poor data quality for both suicide and suicide attempts. The organization states that:

"given the sensitivity of suicide – and the illegality of suicidal behaviour in some countries – it is likely that under-reporting and misclassification are greater problems for suicide than for most other causes of death."

=== Factors ===
Many researchers have attempted to find explanations for why gender is such a significant indicator for suicide. A common explanation relies on the social constructions of hegemonic masculinity and femininity. According to literature on gender and suicide, male suicide rates are explained in terms of traditional gender roles. Male gender roles tend to emphasize greater levels of strength, independence, risk-taking behavior, economic status, and individualism. Reinforcement of this gender role often prevents men from seeking help for suicidal feelings and depression.

Various other factors have been put forward as the cause of the gender paradox. Part of the gap may be explained by heightened levels of stress that result from traditional gender roles. For example, the death of a spouse and divorce are risk factors for suicide in both genders, but the effect is somewhat mitigated for women. In the Western world, women are more likely to maintain social and familial connections that they can turn to for support after losing their spouse. Another factor closely tied to gender roles is male employment status. Men's vulnerability may be heightened during times of unemployment because of societal expectations that they should provide for themselves and their families.

The gender gap is less stark in developing nations. One theory put forward for the smaller gap is the increased burden of motherhood due to cultural norms. In regions where the identity of women is constructed around the family, having young children may correlate with lower risks for suicide. At the same time, stigma attached to infertility or having children outside of marriage can contribute to higher rates of suicide among women. Men are more likely to commit suicide who are from less affluent areas, than men who are from more affluent areas.

In 2003, a group of sociologists examined the gender and suicide gap by considering how cultural factors impacted suicide rates. The four cultural factors – power-distance, individualism, uncertainty avoidance, and masculinity – were measured for 66 countries using data from the World Health Organization. Cultural beliefs regarding individualism were most closely tied to the gender gap; countries that placed a higher value on individualism showed higher rates of male suicide. Power-distance, defined as the social separation of people based on finances or status, was negatively correlated with suicide. However, countries with high levels of power-distance had higher rates of female suicide. The study ultimately found that stabilizing cultural factors had a stronger effect on suicide rates for women than men.

=== Differing methods by gender ===
The reported difference in suicide rates for men and women is partially a result of the methods used by each gender. Although women attempt suicide at a higher rate, they are more likely to use methods that are less immediately lethal. Men frequently die by suicide via high mortality actions such as hanging, carbon-monoxide poisoning, and firearms. This is in contrast to women, who tend to rely on drug overdosing. While overdosing can be deadly, it is less immediate and therefore more likely to be caught before death occurs. In Europe, where the gender discrepancy is the greatest, a study found that the most frequent method of suicide among both genders was hanging; however, the use of hanging was significantly higher in men (54.3%) than in women (35.6%). The same study found that the second most common methods were firearms (9.7%) for men and poisoning by drugs (24.7%) for women.

Some research says that men using deadlier means to die by suicide cannot be the only reason for the gender disparity. One reason for this may be that men who try to commit suicide may have a stronger and more genuine will to end their own lives, while women engage in more "suicidal gestures". Other research suggests that even when men and women use the same methods, men are still more likely to die from them.

=== Preventive strategies ===
In the United States, both the Department of Health and Human Services and the American Foundation for Suicide Prevention address different methods of reducing suicide, but do not recognize the separate needs of men and women. In 2002, the English Department of Health launched a suicide prevention campaign that was aimed at high-risk groups including young men, prisoners, and those with mental health disorders. The Campaign Against Living Miserably is a charity in the UK that attempts to highlight this issue for public discussion. Some studies have found that because young women are at a higher risk of attempting suicide, policies tailored towards this demographic are most effective at reducing overall rates. Researchers have also recommended more aggressive and long-term treatments and follow up for men that show indications of suicidal thoughts. Shifting cultural attitudes about gender roles and norms, and especially ideas about masculinity, may also contribute to closing the gender gap. In 2015, the online resource HeadsUpGuys was launched at the University of British Columbia in Canada with the aim of reducing male deaths by suicide.

== Statistics ==
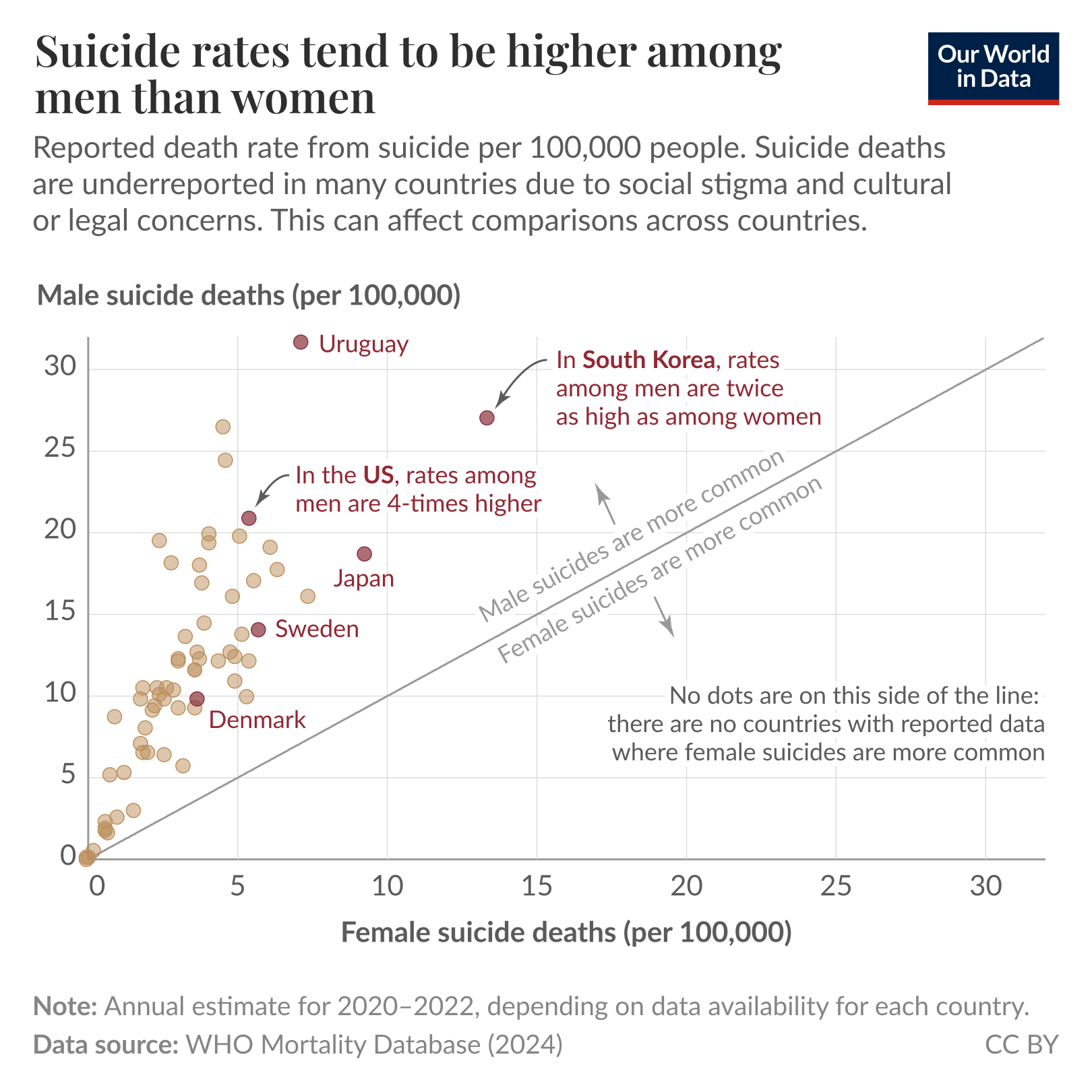
Suicides rates of men compared to those of women by country

Estimated global suicide death rate by sex

The incidence of suicide is vastly higher among men than women among all age groups in most of the world. As of 2015, almost two-thirds of worldwide suicides (representing about 1.5% of all deaths) are by men.

Incidence of male–female suicide ratio by WHO region (2008)
Rank	Region (% of world pop)	Male–Female Ratio	Suicide Rate (per 100,000)
1	Europe (13%)	4.0 : 1	14.2
2	Americas (13.5%)	3.6 : 1	7.9
3	South Eastern Asia (26%)	1.5 : 1	15.6
4	Western Pacific (26%)	1.3 : 1	12.6
5	Africa (13%)	2.2 : 1	6.4
6	Eastern Mediterranean (8.5%)	1.1 : 1	5.6
–	World	1.8 : 1	11.6

Incidence of male–female suicide ratio by country (2015)
Rank	Country	Male–Female ratio	Suicide rate (per 100,000)
1	Sri Lanka	4.4 : 1	34.6
2	Lithuania	5.8 : 1	26.1
3	Mongolia	5.2 : 1	28.1
4	Kazakhstan	5.0 : 1	27.5
5	Belarus	6.5 : 1	19.1
6	Poland	6.7 : 1	18.5
7	Latvia	6.7 : 1	17.4
8	Russia	5.8 : 1	17.9
9	Guyana	3.0 : 1	30.6
10	Suriname	3.3 : 1	26.9
–	World	1.7 : 1	10.7

=== United States ===
Since the 1950s, typically men die from suicide three to five times more often than women. Use of mental health resources may be a significant contributor to the gender difference in suicide rates in the US. Studies have shown that women are 13–21% more likely than men to receive a psychiatric affective diagnosis. 72–89% of women who died by suicide had contact with a mental health professional at some point in their life and 41–58% of men who died by suicide had contact with a mental health professional.

Within the United States, there are variances in rates of suicide by ethnic group. For example, from 1999 to 2004, the rate of suicide for Native American adolescent boys is nearly 20 per 100,000, while the rate for African-American adolescent girls is roughly 1 per 100,000. According to the CDC, as of 2013 the suicide rates of Whites and Native Americans are more than twice the rates of African Americans and Hispanics. However, Whites have a lower suicide attempt rate than Hispanics, and Black and White men had the lowest rate of suicide attempts.

=== Europe ===
The gender-suicide gap is generally highest in Western countries. Among the nations of Europe, the gender gap is particularly large in Eastern European countries such as Lithuania, Belarus, and Hungary. Some researchers attribute the higher rates in former Soviet countries to be a remnant of recent political instability. An increased focus on family led to women becoming more highly valued. Rapid economic fluctuations prevented men from providing fully for their families, which prevented them from fulfilling their traditional gender role. Combined, these factors could account for the gender gap. Other research indicates that higher instances of alcoholism among men in these nations may be to blame. In 2014, suicides rates amongst under-45 men in UK reached a 15-year high of 78% of the total 5,140.

=== Non-Western nations ===
A higher male mortality from suicide is also evident from data of non-Western countries: the Caribbean, often considered part of the West is the most prominent example. In 1979–81, out of 74 countries with a non-zero suicide rate, 69 countries had male suicide rates greater than their female rates, two reported equal rates for the sexes (Seychelles and Kenya), while three reported female rates exceeding male rates (Papua New Guinea, Macau, and French Guiana). That contrast was greater in 2012, with WHO statistics showing China as the only country where the female suicide rate matches or exceeds the male rate. Barraclough found that the female rates of those aged 5–14 equaled or exceeded the male rates only in 14 countries, mainly in South America and Asia.

=== China ===
In most countries, the majority of suicides are by men but in China, women are slightly more likely to die by suicide than men. In 2015 China's ratio was around 8 men for every 10 women. According to the WHO, as of 2016, the suicide rates in China for men and women were almost the same – 9.1 for male versus 10.3 for female (the rate is per 100,000 people).

Traditional gender roles in China hold women responsible for keeping the family happy and intact. Suicide for women in China is shown in literature to be an acceptable way to avoid disgrace that may be brought to themselves or their families. According to a 2002 review, the most common reasons for the difference in rate between genders are: "the lower status of Chinese women, love, marriage, marital infidelity, and family problems, the methods used to commit suicide, and mental health of Chinese women." Another explanation for increased suicide in women in China is that pesticides are easily accessible and tend to be used in many suicide attempts made by women. The rate of nonlethal suicidal behavior is 40 to 60 percent higher in women than it is in men. This is due to the fact that more women are diagnosed as depressed than men, and also that depression is correlated with suicide attempts. However, thanks to urbanization, suicide rates in China – for both women and men – have dropped by 64% from 1990 to 2016.

== See also ==
- List of suicides in the 21st century
- List of suicides (antiquity-present)
  - List of suicides (A–M)
  - List of suicides (N–Z)
- Men's health
- Mental disorders and gender
- Mental health inequality
- Social determinants of mental health
- Suicide among LGBTQ people
