= Suicide (disambiguation) =

Suicide is the act of intentionally ending one's own life (and can be a noun for a person who has died by suicide).

Suicide may also refer to:

== Arts, entertainment and media ==
- Suicide (wrestling), a professional wrestling persona, used by multiple professional wrestlers
- Suicide (game), a type of street game that involves the bouncing of a ball against a wall
- Suicide (Durkheim book), an 1897 case study on suicide by French sociologist Émile Durkheim
- Suicide (novel), a 2008 short novel by Edouard Levé
- Suicide (Suvorov book), a 2001 book by Viktor Suvorov
- Suicides (short story), a short story by Guy de Maupassant

=== Music ===
- Suicide (band), an American electronic/punk band, intermittently active from 1970–2016
  - Suicide (1977 album), the first album by Suicide
  - Suicide: Alan Vega and Martin Rev, the second album by Suicide
- Suicide, a 1999 album by American rock band Sweet Water
- Suicide, a 2010 mixtape by American rapper Lil Scrappy
- "Suicide", a song by The Devin Townsend Band from the 2003 album Accelerated Evolution
- "Suicide", a song by Hirax from the 1985 album Raging Violence
- "Suicide", a song by R. Kelly from the 1998 album R.
- "Suicide", a song by T-Pain from the 2007 album Epiphany
- "Suicide", a song by Thin Lizzy from the 1975 album Fighting
- "Suicide", a song by Kai Tracid from the 2002 album Trance & Acid

== Other uses ==
- Animal suicide, suicide in animals concerns self-destructive behavior of various species in the animal kingdom
- Aokigahara (also called the Suicide Forest), in Japan
- Euthanasia, the practice of intentionally ending life to relieve pain and suffering
- History of suicide
- Suicide (b-boy move), a breakdancer's sudden drop to their back
- Suicide cable, a double-ended male connector for utility-supplied electrical power
- Suicide Hill (Montana), a mountain in the U.S. state of Montana
- Suicide, a trick with the diabolo juggling prop, in which the player lets go with one hand and spins the diabolo freely
- A slang term for a mixture of every flavor available at a soda fountain

== See also ==
- Suicide terminology
- The Suicide (disambiguation)
