= Ejaculation disorders =

Most common sexual dysfunction in men

Ejaculation disorders are the most common sexual dysfunction in men. Common ejaculatory disorders include: premature ejaculation, retrograde ejaculation, delayed ejaculation, anejaculation, inhibited ejaculation, anorgasmia and ejaculatory anhedonia.

== See also ==
- Men's health
- Dapoxetine
