= List of killings by law enforcement officers in the United States, June 2016 =

This is a list of people reported killed by non-military law enforcement officers in the United States in June 2016, whether in the line of duty or not, and regardless of reason or method. The listing documents the occurrence of a death, making no implications regarding wrongdoing or justification on the part of the person killed or officer involved. Killings are arranged by date of the incident that caused death. Different death dates, if known, are noted in the description. The table below lists 95 people.

== June 2016 ==
Date	Name (age) of deceased	State (city)	Description
2016-06-30	Vilters, Tristan (24)	Colorado (Guffey)	
2016-06-30	Patrick, Kawme (25)	Ohio (Columbus)	
2016-06-30	Schumacher, Michael (41)	Wisconsin (Madison)	
2016-06-30	Ramirez, Jasen (44)	Wyoming (Douglas)	
2016-06-29	Evans, Lafayette (37)	Iowa (Fort Madison)	
2016-06-29	Mills, Jessie (30)	Kentucky (Flat Lick)	
2016-06-29	Reado, Tyrone (50)	Louisiana (Monroe)	
2016-06-28	Prak, Barry (27)	California (Long Beach)	
2016-06-28	Dang, Walden (61)	Hawaii (Honolulu)	
2016-06-27	Rodriguez, Edgar (30)	California (Bakersfield)	Rodriguez was struck and killed by a Bakersfield Police Department vehicle on California State Route 58.
2016-06-27	Evans, Sherman (63)	Washington, DC	
2016-06-27	Hutson, Raymond (25)	Delaware (Frederica)	
2016-06-27	Peacock, Blake (32)	Georgia (Empire)	
2016-06-27	Disbrowe, Michael (28)	Iowa (Boone)	
2016-06-27	Vierra, Travis (26)	New Mexico (Laguna Pueblo)	
2016-06-26	Valladares, Jamil (26)	Florida (Riverview)	
2016-06-26	Reyes, Daniel (27)	Connecticut (Thomaston)	Reyes was killed by a police officer at his house after moving towards them with a knife. Reyes told the officer to shoot him before his death.
2016-06-26	Johnson, Donte (30)	Illinois (Dolton)	
2016-06-26	Maurer, Terry Lynn (51)	Michigan (Clark lake)	
2016-06-26	Kennedy, Germichael (22)	Nebraska (Lincoln)	
2016-06-25	Noble, Dylan (19)	California (Fresno)	Killing of Dylan Noble: Fresno Police shot and killed Dylan Noble, a 19-year-old white man with mental health issues. Police had been responding to reports of a man with a rifle when they pulled over Noble as he drove his pickup truck. After Noble stepped out of his truck, police say, he had one arm behind his back. Police shot him four times. He was later found to be unarmed, and died at a Fresno hospital. His death sparked worldwide headlines, and sparked local outrage. White Lives Matter protests were held at the Chevron gas station where the shooting took place, and his parents spoke to reporters on July 7. The family's lawyers are working on a wrongful death lawsuit against the Fresno Police Department. The Fresno County District Attorney has decided that there will be no criminal charges against the officers involved in the shooting. The City of Fresno settled the lawsuit by Noble's parents, agreeing to pay $2.8 million.
2016-06-25	Ferguson, William	Arizona (Buckeye)	
2016-06-25	Bogusiewicz, Waldemar (59)	Florida (Pinellas Park)	
2016-06-25	Guardiola, Rodrigo (36)	Georgia (Gainesville)	
2016-06-24	Sheats, Christy (42)	Texas (Fulshear)	Sheats was shot by a Fulshear police officer after she fatally shot her two daughters.
2016-06-24	Blecher, Randy (50)	Arkansas (Farmington)	
2016-06-24	Miranda, Ismael (36)	New Jersey (Paterson)	
2016-06-24	Chavez-Angeles, Miguel (42)	Oklahoma (Oklahoma City)	
2016-06-23	Brown, Angelo (35)	Illinois (Belleville)	
2016-06-23	Herrera, Josh (29)	New Mexico (Hanover)	
2016-06-23	Anderson, Jay (25)	Wisconsin (Wauwatosa)	
2016-06-22	Rogers, Deravis Caine (22)	Georgia (Atlanta)	Atlanta police officer James Burns shot and killed Deravis Caine Rogers on Monroe Place in Midtown Atlanta. The following month, he turned himself into the Fulton County jail; the county district attorney has indicated he will face multiple charges, including felony murder.
2016-06-22	Core, Isaiah (20)	Alabama (Birmingham)	
2016-06-22	Williams, Josiah (25)	Colorado (Colorado Springs)	
2016-06-22	Ponce, Roger (37)	Florida (Wellington)	
2016-06-22	Splunge, Quencezola (44)	Mississippi (Walls)	
2016-06-22	Walke, Shaun (31)	Texas (Bellville)	
2016-06-21	Cruz-Amado, Pedro (24)	North Carolina (Lawndale)	
2016-06-21	Lesko, Lane (19)	New Hampshire (Peterborough)	
2016-06-21	Hyde, Jeffrey (50)	Wyoming (Casper)	
2016-06-20	Scott, Devin (20)	Arizona (Lake Havasu City)	
2016-06-20	Bostick, Raphael (23)	South Carolina (Hardeeville)	
2016-06-19	Ford, Anthony (30)	Florida (Fort Walton Beach)	
2016-06-19	Howard, Clarence (22)	Florida (Palm Bay)	
2016-06-19	Lloyd, Rashaun (25)	New York (Bronx)	
2016-06-19	Maddox, Terry (41)	New York (Syracuse)	
2016-06-18	Hennessey, William (34)	Alabama (Huntsville)	
2016-06-18	Makarenko, Sergey (17)	California (Carmichael)	
2016-06-18	Shumpert, Antwun (37)	Mississippi (Tupelo)	
2016-06-16	Damon, Nicholas (30)	Colorado (Arvada)	
2016-06-16	Grandpre, Peter (36)	Montana (Butte)	
2016-06-16	Anderson, John (59)	Ohio (Montpelier)	
2016-06-15	Delfino, Ronald (21)	New Mexico (Albuquerque)	
2016-06-15	Rosser, Russell (43)	Oklahoma (Tulsa)	
2016-06-15	Rasmssen, Michael (38)	Wisconsin (Pembine)	
2016-06-14	Llanez, Fernando (22)	California (Chula Vista)	
2016-06-14	Rodriguez, Noel (50)	Idaho (Boise)	
2016-06-14	Ferro, Nicholas (47)	Missouri (Odessa)	
2016-06-14	Moghaddam, Mohammad (54)	Texas (Amarillo)	
2016-06-13	Scism, Joshua (33)	New York (Schenectady)	Plainclothes police parked an unmarked van outside Scism's residence while preparing an informant to make a drug purchase. Scism walked up to the van and confronted them, before turning and walking away, pulling up his shirt to display a handgun in his waistband, with an officer shooting him in the back of the head. The officer claimed Scism had pulled the weapon in him.
2016-06-13	Moore, Michael (18)	Alabama (Mobile)	
2016-06-13	Kelley, Frank (38)	Michigan (Grand Rapids)	
2016-06-13	Acquisto, Edward (80)	Rhode Island (Tiverton)	
2016-06-13	Pointer, Kenneth (43)	Washington (Ridgefield)	
2016-06-12	Mateen, Omar Mir Seddique (29)	Florida (Orlando)	Omar Mateen, a New York-born US citizen of Afghan descent residing in Fort Pierce, Florida, entered the Pulse nightclub at around 2:00 a.m. armed with a semiautomatic rifle and handgun. After committing what was at that point the deadliest mass shooting in modern U.S. history, Mateen was killed around 5:00 a.m. during a gunfight involving him and eleven SWAT officers.
2016-06-12	Williams, John (61)	Kentucky (Glasgow)	
2016-06-12	Edwards, Daniel (23)	Utah (Eagle Mountain)	
2016-06-12	Duran, Jesus (31)	California (Maywood)	
2016-06-11	Witherspoon, Lyndarius (27)	Mississippi (Tupelo	
2016-06-10	Sanchez, Bobby (32)	Colorado (Pueblo)	
2016-06-10	Milsaps, Clayton (29)	North Carolina (Statesville)	
2016-06-10	Briseno-Ortego, J. Juan (50)	Washington (Yakima)	
2016-06-09	Hollis, William (34)	Alabama (Birmingham)	
2016-06-09	Tucker, Clifford (68)	Arizona (Somerton)	
2016-06-09	Unnamed person	Michigan (Ishpeming)	
2016-06-09	Nickol, James (38)	Pennsylvania (York)	
2016-06-09	Brisco, John (52)	Texas (Port Arthur)	
2016-06-08	Powell, William (63)	Georgia (Stockbridge)	Responding to a 911 call made in the late hours of June 7, three Henry County police officers entered the wrong home where they encountered Air Force veteran Powell, who had armed himself with a gun. After allegedly having been ordered to drop his gun, Powell was shot in the neck by Sgt. Patrick D. Snook and died the next day (June 9) at Atlanta Medical Center.
2016-06-08	Garcia, Carlos (43)	Missouri (Kansas City)	
2016-06-07	Villagomez, Omar (21)	California (Turlock)	Omar Villagomez was shot and killed by officers from the Stanislaus County, California, Drug Enforcement Agency in a parking lot on West Main Street in Turlock on Tuesday, June 7. Officers were trying to arrest Villagomez when the vehicle he was driving collided with an unmarked police vehicle. At that point the officers fired at Villagomez, killing him. The passenger, Juan Bulgara, 27, was not shot, but was taken to a hospital for injuries sustained in the vehicle crash.
2016-06-07	Henson, Andrew (25)	Oklahoma (Wagoner)	
2016-06-07	Walker, Willis (49)	Virginia (Culpeper)	
2016-06-06	Rapoza, Kalyp (25)	Hawaii (Hilo)	
2016-06-06	Green V, Henry (23)	Ohio (South Linden)	Green was approached by Columbus police officers who were patrolling the corner of Duxberry and Ontario in the Linden area in civilian clothes in an unmarked car as part of the Summer Community Safety Initiative. Police said that Green had a gun and when asked to drop the gun, Green was shot. Green died of his wounds at the hospital. Ohio has an open-carry gun law.
2016-06-05	Moran, Christopher (31)	Florida (Cape Coral)	
2016-06-04	Rhymes, Demarco (35)	Alabama (Eufaula)	
2016-06-04	Shaham, Daniel (31)	California (Montague)	
2016-06-04	Stepp, Larry (31)	Indiana (Muncie)	
2016-06-03	Heart, Jamie Lee Brave (28)	South Dakota (Pine Ridge)	
2016-06-02	Smith, Joshua (33)	Alaska (Palmer)	
2016-06-02	Rodriquez Smith, Rodney (18)	North Carolina (Charlotte)	
2016-06-02	James, Willia "Meat-Meat" (43)	Virginia (Norfolk)	
2016-06-01	Unnamed person	Arizona (Phoenix)	
2016-06-01	Johnson, Michael (21)	Georgia (Newnan)	
2016-06-01	Pigg, Daniel (51)	Kentucky (Berea)	
