= Distinguished Gentleman's Ride =

Global motorcycle fund-raising event

The Distinguished Gentleman's Ride is a global motorcycle event raising funds and awareness for prostate cancer research and men's mental health programs on behalf of the Movember Foundation.

Open to all genders, The Distinguished Gentleman's Ride was founded in 2012 by Mark Hawwa in Sydney, Australia, and is centred around classic and vintage styled motorcycles. While the event encompasses classic and vintage style, it also welcomes niche custom motorcycle styles such as cafe racers, choppers, scramblers, and more.

To date the event has raised $31.6 million USD, from 340,000 classic and vintage riders, located in 115 countries.

The ride provides an outline of dress and behaviour, suggesting riders wear dapper clothing, silk vests, tweed suits and behave courteously, donning not only classic style, but classic manners. Suggested motorcycles for the themed ride include café racers, bobbers, classics, modern classics, flat trackers, scramblers, old school choppers, brat styled, classic scooters, and classic sidecars. The ride carries no entry fee; however, some rides require minimum donation amounts to join. All riders are encouraged to raise funds for prostate cancer research and men's mental health programs on behalf of charity partner the Movember Foundation.

In 2014 Triumph Motorcycles started to support and sponsor the ride. For 2019, joining global sponsors Triumph Motorcycles are luxury helmet brand, Hedon Helmets, as well as REV'IT!, and Elf Lubricants, joining the event as global prize sponsor.

In 2015 one of the three motorcycles ridden by actor Chris Pratt in Jurassic World was auctioned off, with the profits going to the prostate cancer funds.

- In 2012 over 2,500 riders participated in rides across 64 cities. The success of the event encouraged the organisers to consider how it could be used to support a worthy cause.
- In 2013, over 11,000 participants in 145 cities around the world raised over $277k AUD for the research of prostate cancer.
- In 2014, 20.000 riders in more than 250 cities collected nearly $1.5M USD into prostate cancer research on behalf of the Prostate Cancer Foundation UK, USA, Canada, New Zealand and Australia.
- In 2015, more than 37,000 participants in 410 cities from 79 countries mounted their motorcycles to raise awareness and $2.3M USD into prostate cancer research on behalf of the Prostate Cancer Foundation UK, USA, Canada, New Zealand and Australia.
- In 2016, more than 57,000 participants in 505 cities from 90 countries mounted their motorcycles to raise awareness and $3.65M USD to help fund research into prostate cancer and support male suicide prevention on behalf of The Movember Foundation.
- In 2017, more than 93,000 participants in 582 cities from 92 countries rallied to raise awareness and $4.85M USD to help fund research into prostate cancer and support men's mental health on behalf of The Movember Foundation.
- In 2018, more than 115,000 participants in 648 cities from 101 countries rallied to raise awareness and $6.1M USD to help fund research into prostate cancer and support men's mental health on behalf of The Movember Foundation.
- In 2019, more than 116,000 participants in 678 cities from 104 countries rallied to raise awareness and $6M USD to help fund research into prostate cancer and support men's mental health on behalf of The Movember Foundation.

== Schedule ==
The event takes place on the last Sunday in September each year.

Year	September	Number of registered riders worldwide	Funds Raised
2012	30th	2.500	N/A
2013	29th	11.000	$277k AUD
2014	28th	20.000	$1.5M USD
2015	27th	37.000	$2.3M USD
2016	25th	57.000	$3.65M USD
2017	24th	94.000	$4.85M USD
2018	30th	114.000	$6.1M USD
2019	29th	116.000	$6M USD
