= The Suicide =

The Suicide may refer to:

- The Suicide (play)
- "The Suicide" (Seinfeld)
- Le Suicidé, painting by Manet

== See also ==
- Suicide (disambiguation)
- "The Suicider", a song by Sentenced from the album Frozen
