= List of killings by law enforcement officers in the United States, January 2018 =

This is a list of people reported killed by non-military law enforcement officers in the United States in January 2018, whether in the line of duty or not, and regardless of reason or method. The listing documents the occurrence of a death, making no implications regarding wrongdoing or justification on the part of the person killed or officer involved. Killings are arranged by date of the incident that caused death. Different death dates, if known, are noted in the description. The table below lists 107 people.

== January 2018 ==
Date	Name (age) of deceased	State (city)	Description
2018-01-31	Gilberto Salas (20)	St. James, Minnesota	Police and sheriff's deputies chased a stolen vehicle until it drove into a snowbank. Salas got out and ran into a store, and officers heard shots from inside. They entered and confronted Salas, used Tasers on him multiple times, and finally shot him.
2018-01-31	Adrian Valdez (39)	Arvada, Colorado	Police responding to a report of a "suspicious person" found Valdez, armed with a knife, and determined that he was wanted on a felony warrant. They ordered him to drop the knife; he did not and, when Valdez approached officers, they shot him.
2018-01-30	Ricky Leon Rusche (40)	Pink, Oklahoma	A judge issued a warrant for Rusche's arrest for escaping from prison. U.S. marshals and sheriff’s deputies found him; they shot Rusche during his arrest.
2018-01-29	Khalil Lawal (31)	Philadelphia, Pennsylvania	An off-duty Philadelphia police officer shot Khalil Lawal, who allegedly appeared to be intentionally trying to run down people in South Philadelphia, police said.
2018-01-29	Mark Renee Flores (46)	Houston, Texas	Flores stabbed a man he had been arguing with, then stole his car. He was found hours later asleep in the car, but awoke when deputies approached; Flores brandished a knife at them and drove off. He was found again later, again threatened deputies with a knife, and they shot him.
2018-01-29	Michael Hansford (52)	Bronx, New York	Hansford was arguing with his landlord and threatening him with a knife. The argument moved into the street as police arrived. When Hansford approached them and refused to drop the weapon, police shot him.
2018-01-28	Paul David Johnson (38)	Chamblee, Georgia	Police received reports of a driver shooting at other drivers. (One driver was wounded, shot in the hand.) Eventually the reports led them to where Johnson was in a parking lot, shooting at passing cars. During a foot chase, police shot him.
2018-01-28	Gregory Kocian (33)	Conroe, Texas	Police approached Kocian, who was sitting in his car, and Kocian drove off. Police pursued, and during the chase Kocian shot at them. An officer returned fire, killing Kocian.
2018-01-28	Billy Lewis Rucker (33)	Baltimore, Maryland	Police pulled Rucker over for a traffic violation, but then Rucker drove off. After a car chase, Rucker and his passenger ditched the car and a foot chase ensued, during which Rucker turned and pointed a gun at officers.
2018-01-28	Anthony S. McDaniel (45)	London, Kentucky	McDaniels was reported to be shooting a gun outside his home. When police arrived, he shot at them, and they killed him.
2018-01-27	William Pollard (45)	Walton, Indiana	Police responded to a call that Pollard was stabbing himself. But when they arrived, they ended up shooting Pollard when he approached officers with a knife after repeated instruction to drop the weapon.
2018-01-27	Kirsten Kloppe (43)	San Antonio, Texas	Kloppe called to report someone was stalking her. Police found her in her home, pointing a gun to her own head. As they tried to negotiate with and disarm her, Kloppe's motions brought the gun to bear on police, and they shot her.
2018-01-27	Crystalline Barnes (21)	Jackson, Mississippi	Barnes was pulled over in a traffic stop, but when the officer approached she started to drive away. Another patrol car arrived, and Barnes drove into it. As Barnes drove toward one of the officers, they shot into her car, killing her.
2018-01-26	Christopher Eric Giles (23)	Austin, Texas	Police received a call about a burglary in the early hours; the victims locked themselves in a closet while the burglar fired shots. When police arrived, Giles was about to drive away from the scene, and when they tried to stop him he shot at them; they returned fire, killing him. Later police determined that the pair living in the home were well-known on YouTube; Giles had become obsessed with one of them and had driven from Albuquerque to break into their home.
2018-01-26	Nathaniel T. Edwards (43)	Rock Falls, Illinois	Edwards drove away from a traffic stop, leading police on a chase. Officers approached Edwards in his car, and Edwards drove his car backward toward them; one of the officers shot him.
2018-01-26	Matthew Zimmerman (42)	Alton, Illinois	Marshals came to a house to execute an arrest warrant on Zimmerman. They found him inside a closet; when he threatened them with a knife, they shot him.
2018-01-26	Axell Vivas (42)	Las Vegas, Nevada	Police received a 911 call that Vivas had shot his wife (who died at the scene) in the presence of their children and then fled their home. Police found Vivas a couple of hours later, a block away sitting in a car. He brandished a gun at them, and they shot him.
2018-01-26	Ulises Valladares (47)	Houston, Texas	An FBI SWAT team was attempting to rescue kidnap victim Valladares. As agents entered the residence, Valladares grabbed an agent's rifle; the agent fired, killing Valladares.
2018-01-25	William Charles Mackenzie (66)	Little Orleans, Maryland	Mackenzie's wife reported that they had fought and that Mackenzie's gun had gone off. Police arrived to find Mackenzie barricaded in their house. A state police team entered the home; Mackenzie shot at them (wounding two officers in the legs), and officers shot and killed him.
2018-01-25	Steven Hutchins (27)	Buford, Georgia	Responding to a report of an armed man on a street, police found Hutchins with a gun in his waistband. He took it out and pointed it at them; when he did not obey orders to drop the gun, police shot him.
2018-01-25	Dustin Gonzales Castillo (19)	San Antonio, Texas	Castillo stole a bicycle and rode onto a nearby freeway. When police finally stopped him, in the struggle Castillo pulled a knife, and officers shot him.
2018-01-24	Chris McKinney (39)	Gadsden, Alabama	According to police, a woman entered the Etowah County Sheriff's Office around 5 p.m., saying a man was in the parking lot harassing people. Two deputies found the man about to enter the sheriff's office and began speaking with him. A fight began and a Taser was used on the man, killing him.
2018-01-24	Humberto Vera-Munoz (27)	Sparks, Nevada	Police were making a traffic stop but the car drove away. They found it again later, chased and stopped the car, when Vera-Munoz got out of the car and fired a gun at them. Officers returned fire, killing him.
2018-01-24	David Byron Kidney (62)	Union Township, Branch County, Michigan	State police serving a search warrant (relating to a cold-case murder) entered a home when Kidney fired a long gun at them. Two officers were shot and wounded, but they were able to return fire and kill Kidney.
2018-01-23	Shane McVey (54)	Idaho Falls, Idaho	Police responded to a report of a "suspicious man" who turned out to be McVey. While talking with him, McVey ran off into an apartment building. When police caught up with him, McVey brandished a weapon and they shot him.
2018-01-23	Ricky Jerome Boyd (24)	Chatham County, Georgia	Marshals and officers went to serve a warrant for Boyd's arrest on a murder charge. Boyd began shooting and officers returned fire.
2018-01-23	Corey Mobley (38)	Bradenton, Florida	Police responded to a report of an argument between Mobley and his wife at a gas station. When they arrived, Mobley drove off with police following. After a car chase and then a foot chase, Mobley turned and confronted police saying he had a gun and reaching for his waistband; they shot him.
2018-01-23	Alvaro Herrera (18)	League City, Texas	Police had a report of an attempted carjacking where the suspect struck the woman owning the car with a pipe. An officer investigating in the area tried to stop Herrera, who fit the suspect description; Herrera attacked him, and the officer shot him.
2018-01-22	John C. Havener, Jr. (41)	Oneida, New York	Police arrived around 4:15 a.m. in response to a call about a man, James Havener, standing in the street, shouting at drivers, police said. Havener was allegedly being disorderly. He was tasered twice, killing him.
2018-01-22	Scott Senior (38)	Crescent City, California	Sheriff's deputies were called to a report of a disturbance; they found Senior, who became hostile in their encounter and reportedly stabbed two deputies. The officers shot him.
2018-01-22	Joshua Dale Prough (36)	Battle Creek, Michigan	Police trying to serve arrest warrants on Prough surrounded his apartment and demanded he come out. When he did not, they went in and found Prough pointing guns at them; four officers shot him.
2018-01-22	Joseph E. Knight (40)	Tulsa, Oklahoma	During a traffic stop, Knight got out of the car and ran into a nearby yard, pointing a gun to his own head. He tried to break into a house but shot himself in the shoulder; he then continued to run and officers shot him during the foot chase.
2018-01-22	Jonathan Duane Atchley (37)	Sallisaw, Oklahoma	A police officer pulled Atchley over for a minor traffic stop, but Atchley got out and began fighting with the officer, and continued to fight when a second officer arrived. The first officer shot him during the fight.
2018-01-22	Joe Delira-Alires (35)	Pueblo, Colorado	Police responding to a report of Delira-Alires shooting a gun outside his ex-girlfriend's house. They chased Delira-Alires, first by car and then on foot, and he was shot as they tried to apprehend him.
2018-01-22	Edward C. Gandy (47)	Millville, New Jersey	Gandy called police, claiming he was standing in an intersection with a gun. When police arrived, there was a confrontation and they shot him; however, they did not find a gun.
2018-01-21	Ronald Jay Lawson (46)	Rockledge, Florida	A sheriff's deputy tried to pull Lawson over for a traffic stop, suspecting drunk driving; but Lawson drove away. During the car chase and after deputies tried to stop Lawson using spike strips, Lawson made some motion that prompted one of the deputies to shoot at him.
2018-01-22	Aaron Olivarez Candanoza (28)	Irving, Texas	Candanoza was reported to be breaking into cars in the early hours. When police arrived, Candanoza tried to drive away in a pickup, colliding with a patrol car and other cars in the lot. An officer shot into the truck, killing him.
2018-01-21	Ilkka Hiironen (35)	Everett, Washington	Hiironen called his wife to say he was suicidal and wanted police to kill him. When officers responded, they said he had what looked like a weapon and refused to drop it. Three deputies opened fire, killing him. A firearm was recovered at the scene.
2018-01-20	Shannon Jason Cables (46)	Lake Wales, Florida	Deputies responded to a domestic disturbance call; Cable had injured his wife and daughter, but when they arrived Cable had already fled the home into nearby woods; deputies searched but could not find him. When the wife and daughter returned home from the hospital a few hours later, they and the deputies saw Cable approaching the house with guns. Deputies confronted him and, when he would not disarm, shot him.
2018-01-20	Nicholas Daniel Moore (23)	Fairmont, Minnesota	Police responded to a call about a woman being threatened, and arrived to find Moore in an apartment hallway bearing two knives. When Moore approached them, one of the officers shot him.
2018-01-20	John Albers (17)	Overland Park, Kansas	Police were called to Albers' home with a report that someone was suicidal. As they arrived, Albers drove out of the garage and at the officers, who shot and killed him.
2018-01-20	Jason Lappe (44)	Dunwoody, Georgia	Lappe robbed a Walmart. As he went into the parking lot and got into a car, another customer followed him and pointed him out to nearby police officers. Lappe got out of the car and approached the officers, who shot him.
2018-01-20	Arther McAfee Jr. (61)	Longview, Texas	A relative of McAfee called sheriff's deputies, asking them to check on him because he had been unreachable. When a deputy arrived, McAfee scuffled with him; when McAfee got hold of the deputy's stun gun, the deputy shot him.
2018-01-19	Marshall H. Coleman (58)	Boonville, Indiana	Officers were dispatched to Governor Boon Square apartments early Friday morning for a report of a man threatening a group of people with knives, according to a release from the Boonville Police Department. Upon arrival, they found a man armed with two large knives. When he refused to drop the knives, an officer fired his Taser at the man several times. When that had no effect, the second officer shot the man with his service weapon.
2018-01-18	Kevin Sturgis (31)	Harrisburg, Pennsylvania	Officers were serving a warrant on a woman along the 1800 block of Mulberry Street around 6:30 a.m. When they attempted to serve it, a man came out of a building and fired on the officers, hitting three. One officer, who was wounded, returned fire and critically injured the gunman.
2018-01-17	Joseph Edward Haynes (16)	Columbus, Ohio	In a hallway outside a Franklin County courtroom, a scuffle involving a teenage defendant, his family members and a deputy ended when the Franklin County sheriff's office deputy, who was knocked to the ground, shot and killed Joseph Edward Haynes.
2018-01-17	Jordan Keckhut (22)	Phoenix, Arizona	Police were called to a gas station in the area of 32nd Street and Thomas Road around 7 p.m. after receiving reports of a man acting erratically. When officers responded to the gas station they learned the suspect had allegedly cut a man's neck with a knife and was threatening others inside the store. The suspect was shot by two officers.
2018-01-17	Jihad Merrick (29)	Nashua, Iowa	Sheriff's deputies got a call about a man pointing a gun at his own head in a car. A little later a deputy made a traffic stop for speeding, and the driver -- Merrick -- got out and pointed a gun at his own head, then got back in the car. After some negotiation, Merrick fired a shot, and the deputies returned fire, killing him.
2018-01-17	Geraldine Townsend (72)	Tulsa, Oklahoma	Police serving a search warrant in a drug case were arresting Townsend's son in their home, when Townsend started shooting at them. Police returned fire,
2018-01-17	Donte D. Shannon (26)	Racine, Wisconsin	Police attempted to stop Shannon for a missing front license plate, but Shannon got out and ran. He turned and pointed a gun at the officers, and they shot him.
2018-01-17	Brian Gregory (34)	Memphis, Tennessee	Police stopped Gregory on a drug warrant, but Gregory used his car to ram their patrol cars. When Gregory reached under his seat, police shot him; they later found a gun in the car.
2018-01-16	Warren Ragudo (34)	Daly City, California	Police were dispatched on the report of a disturbance, police said. Family members were struggling with Warren Ragudo when they arrived. The officers intervened, and after a brief struggle, they were able to restrain him. During the struggle, a Taser was used on the man, killing him.
2018-01-16	Kerry Lee Nield (53)	Gooding, Idaho	Officers responding to a domestic disturbance call found Nield standing in a road holding a rifle. During negotiations with her, officers shot her.
2018-01-16	Bailey Turner (27)	Adams County, Colorado	A sheriff's deputy responding to a disturbance call found Turner standing in an apartment hallway acting aggressively. A Taser shot did not subdue Turner, and the deputy shot him.
2018-01-16	Nathan Giffin (32)	Montpelier, Vermont	Giffin was the suspect in a credit union robbery. Nine officers opened fire on him after a standoff with him on Montpelier High School's athletic fields. He was wielding an Umarex 40XP BB pistol.
2018-01-16	Victor M. Reyes Jr. (30)	Bedford, Texas	Officers were investigating a suspicious vehicle about 2:10 a.m. in the 1200 block of Airport Freeway, police said. The motorist drove off, and the vehicle was later found in the 600 block of Hurst Drive. Police say the shooting happened about 4:30 a.m. after the driver reached for a weapon. An officer fired and struck the driver.
2018-01-15	James Hawkins (35)	Charlotte, North Carolina	Police responded to a call around 4:10 p.m. about a domestic violence assault with a deadly weapon, police said. Officers found a man with a gunshot wound inside the home, police said. Deputy Sheriff James Hawkins, 35, was pronounced dead at the scene. James Hawkins’ wife, Deputy Sheriff Rataba Hawkins, was also involved in the shooting.
2018-01-15	Robert Martinez Jr. (42)	Eugene, Oregon	A deputy investigating a report of a stolen car found the car and approached it. Martinez got out of the car with a gun, and the deputy shot him.
2018-01-14	Christian Escobedo (22)	El Sereno, California	Police received a report of two suspicious men, armed, in the early hours. They arrived to find Escobedo and another man apparently sleeping on the ground. The second man ran away; police had a confrontation with Escobedo, and ended up shooting him. A gun was found at the scene.
2018-01-13	Thomas Yatsko (21)	Cleveland, Ohio	Cleveland police said that Yatsko got into a fight about 11 p.m. at a bowling alley. The brawlers were kicked out of the bar, including Yatsko. Yatsko, however, returned and attacked Sgt. Dean Graziolli, who pulled out his gun and shot Yatsko, according to police.
2018-01-13	Joseph Hilton (42)	Huntersville, North Carolina	Police responding to a call about domestic assault were met by a woman who said that Hilton had assaulted her, was upstairs, and was armed. When they found and confronted Hilton, they shot him.
2018-01-12	Jeff Burleson (36)	Cave Junction, Oregon	Jeff Burleson had been arrested in Florida for aggravated assault with a deadly weapon and domestic violence by strangulation. After posting bail, he removed an electronic monitoring device and went to Oregon. Sgt. James Geiger and other officers saw a pickup associated with Burleson and followed it into a Dairy Queen parking lot. Police approached and told Burleson and the driver to put their hands up. Instead, Burleson allegedly pushed the driver aside and pointed a handgun at Geiger, who shot and killed Burleson.
2018-01-12	Terry Amons (43)	Pittsburg, California	Someone reported an apparent drug deal in a fast-food parking lot. When police arrived, Amons was sitting in a car, and officers saw a handgun next to him. They ordered him to keep his hands in view, but when Amons lowered his arm toward the gun and back up again, they shot him.
2018-01-12	Jared S.R. Williams (31)	Elko, Nevada	Police responding to a domestic disturbance call were admitted to a home by a relative. They heard arguing in a bedroom and went there; as they entered, Williams shot his ex-wife, and police shot him.
2018-01-12	Amanuel Dagebo (22)	Columbus, Ohio	Dagbedo was wanted on a robbery charge. When police found and approached him, there was a confrontation, and they shot Dagbedo, who was found to be armed.
2018-01-12	Remi Sabbe (54)	Sherwood, Oregon	Authorities were informed around 1:30 p.m. of the presence of “a suspicious vehicle,” appearing to be a pickup truck, driving in a field near Sherwood. When local police arrived at the scene and tried to engage the driver, he reportedly shot at the officer several times while driving farther away into the field. A tactical unit reportedly dispatched an armored vehicle onto the field around 3:30 p.m. and engaged Sabbe. Authorities ultimately “fired upon the suspect," according to the sheriff.
2018-01-12	Juan Valencia (36)	Puyallup, Washington	Police received several reports of erratic and dangerous driving. They found the suspected car empty, but with a shotgun on the seat. Police began investigating the area and Valencia shot at them, using a utility pole as cover. They attempted to negotiate with him. Valencia fired his weapon again and seven officers returned fire, killing him.
2018-01-12	Jason D. Whittemore (38)	Scottsville, Kentucky	Allen County sheriff's deputies responded to a 911 call in regard to a man showing off a handgun while he approached houses. Police say when the deputies arrived, Whittemore refused to listen to orders. A deputy fired one round at Whittemore, fatally wounding him.
2018-01-11	Jonathan Bennett (23)	Charlotte, North Carolina	A homicide suspect being sought by police ambushed officers outside Charlotte-Mecklenburg Police headquarters, shooting one officer in the leg before being killed by return fire.
2018-01-11	Justin Coy Adkins (44)	Lexington County, South Carolina	Police tried to pull Adkins over for a traffic stop, but he drove off. During the chase, apparently, police determined that Adkins was wanted on an earlier attempted murder charge. When the chase ended and officers approached Adkins' car, they saw he had a gun and shot him.
2018-01-11	Jose Arroyo-Rosales (60)	Fort Worth, Texas	Officers serving a warrant in a drug case were going through a home. They opened a bedroom door and found Arroyo-Rosales pointing a gun at them, and they shot him.
2018-01-10	Shalun Dique Smith (21)	Palmdale, California	After an armed robbery at a store, deputies found the suspects in a car, but they drove off. Deputies eventually stopped the chase by ramming the suspect car. Four men got out, one of them Smith, who turned toward deputies and was shot.
2018-01-09	Thompson Nguyen (27)	San Jose, California	Employees at a power plant reported a man had climbed a fence into the property. Police found Nguyen, armed with an ax; when he refused to disarm, police shot him.
2018-01-08	Unknown man	Horn Lake, Mississippi	Police were investigating a series of armed robberies at ATMs. A plainclothes officer staked out an ATM and eventually a suspect approached him armed with a handgun. When the officer identified himself, the suspect got in a car and rammed police cars as he tried to escape. The suspect fired his gun, and officers returned fire.
2018-01-08	Primitivo Macias-Rodriguez (46)	Los Angeles, California	Police saw and followed a car driving erratically; Macias-Rodriguez was the driver. Eventually he crashed, and as he got out of the car he brandished a gun, prompting police to shoot him.
2018-01-08	Travis T. Griffin (20)	Kansas City, Missouri	Police made a traffic stop on a car that Griffin was in, among others. Griffin got out and ran, and during a foot chase displayed a gun; an officer then shot him.
2018-01-08	Eugene Loftis (25)	Church Hill, Tennessee	Dupties received a tip about a man wanted in a robbery case. When they arrived, they found Loftis sitting in a car; Loftis reached for a gun and the deputies shot him.
2018-01-07	Skyler Burnette (21)	Sparta, Wisconsin	Police responded to a report of a domestic violence incident at a home. When they arrived, a man allegedly was threatening a woman with a knife. A deputy with the Monroe County Sheriff's Office shot and killed him.
2018-01-07	Daniel Saavedra-Arreola (24)	Albuquerque, New Mexico	Police received a 911 call from someone at an apartment about a burglary in progress. Upon arrival, the officers allegedly were confronted by a man with a three-inch knife and a metal pipe. At least one officer shot and killed him.
2018-01-07	Tyler Miller (51)	Sedona, Arizona	Miller, who was from Kansas, crashed his truck while driving to a retreat in Arizona. A U.S. Forest Service officer who came upon the scene and stopped, apparently got into a confrontation with Miller and shot and killed him. (Miller was unarmed.)
2018-01-07	Trayvon Mitchell (38)	Lauderhill, Florida	A man flagged down police to report that another man had robbed him of a backpack. Police searched the area and came upon Mitchell in a backyard, and shot him.
2018-01-07	Richard R. Towler (54)	Danville, Virginia	Police responded to a report of shots fired. When they arrived, someone in the house fired out at them; then Towler came out of the house shooting. Police killed him, then went inside and found a woman who had been shot dead.
2018-01-07	Alejandro Valdez (27)	Santa Maria, California	Police were told that Valdez was suicidal and threatening family members. When they arrived, Valdez came at them with knives, and they shot him.
2018-01-07	Michael Bender (27)	Tacoma, Washington	Firefighters were called to a home at about 10:45 p.m. and found heavy flames coming from the garage. Minutes later, police say they were told a man had walked out of the home and was crawling on the lawn with a rifle. A Tacoma Police spokesperson said officers found Bender walking back toward the home and that he refused when officers ordered him to put down his rifle. Bender and the officers exchanged fire, and he was killed.
2018-01-07	Charles Smith Jr. (17)	North Little Rock, Arkansas	North Little Rock police stopped a vehicle occupied by Smith and two other individuals just after 1 a.m. According to a police spokesman, officers found a gun on the teen while patting him down. A struggle ensued between the officers and Smith, and the teen fired at least one shot, police said. Officers returned fire, fatally wounding Smith.
2018-01-06	Jackie Harlan Roberts (62)	Grayson Valley, Alabama	Deputies responded just after 12:30 p.m. to a home. Police said they received a report that a man had assaulted his sister and husband at their home. Jackie Harlan Roberts allegedly went outside to his car and armed himself with a handgun. Deputies found him sitting in the car with a gun in his hand. Roberts ignored commands to drop the weapon and began waving it around. A deputy shot and killed him.
2018-01-06	Jonathan William Leroy (39)	McLoud, Oklahoma	Police received a call about a man threatening family members. When they arrived at the scene, they saw Leroy, who fit the suspect description, walking down the street with a baseball bat. When they confronted him, he swung the bat at them, and they shot him.
2018-01-06	John Bailon (40)	Los Lunas, New Mexico	Police were investigating a stolen vehicle when they got into a fight with Bailon.
2018-01-06	Guillermo Mendoza (57)	San Carlos Park, Florida	Police were called to Mendoza's home due to a domestic disturbance. Mendoza pointed a gun at them, and they shot him.
2018-01-06	Gregory Stough (27)	Manchester Township, York County, Pennsylvania	Police checked out Stough sitting in his car in a parking lot and found that he had several arrest warrants and a suspended drivers license. When they tried to arrest him, Stough drove his car at them, and one of the officers shot him.
2018-01-06	Richard Rangel (21)	Round Rock, Texas	Police found Rangel breaking into cars in the early hours. When they confronted him, Rangel pulled a gun and shot at them; police returned fire, killing him.
2018-01-06	Daniel Saavedra-Arreola (24)	Albuquerque, New Mexico	Police officers responding to a report of a burglary discovered Saavedra-Arreola, who confronted them with a knife and a pipe; they shot him.
2018-01-05	William B. Oleson (46)	Springfield, Missouri	Police received a call about men breaking into a shed. When they arrived, Oleson ran one way, pointed a gun at the officers, and they shot him; another suspect ran another way and was eventually arrested.
2018-01-05	Ledarren D. Mixon (28)	Whitehall, Ohio	Police serving a narcotics search warrant were confronted by Mixon with a gun, and they shot him.
2018-01-05	Andy Vo (35)	Long Beach, California	A 911 caller said he was a hotel employee being held hostage by an armed man. On arrival, police saw Vo in the lobby with a gun, ordered him to drop it, and when he didn't, shot him.
2018-01-04	Robert Hansen (27)	Boise, Idaho	Hansen was a passenger in a car that police stopped for a traffic violation. He displayed a handgun, and during a confrontation with the officers they shot him.
2018-01-04	Brandon O. Cude (31)	Crandon, Wisconsin	A sheriff's deputy stopped to render aid to Cude, a stranded driver. The deputy determined that Cude was wanted for child sexual assault in Texas; when Cude realized that, he pointed a shotgun at the deputy, who then shot him.
2018-01-03	Shaleem Tindle (28)	Oakland, California	A witness describes seeing two men argue across the street from the West Oakland BART station. One of them shot the other, and a BART officer (transit police) ran toward the scene and shot Tindle.
2018-01-02	David Melton (35)	Greenville, North Carolina	Off-duty Greenville Police Officer Timothy Greene was shopping at Academy Sports in Greenville when a person told him a man was shoplifting. Greene confronted David Melton outside the store, a fight began, and the man allegedly attacked Greene with a knife. Greene shot and killed Melton.
2018-01-02	Orestes Amador Jr (51)	Hialeah, Florida	A Hialeah police unit and a black Volkswagen Passat collided about 7 p.m. at the intersection of East Fifth Avenue and Hialeah Drive, police said. Orestes Amador Jr. was killed.
2018-01-02	Shana Diane Musquiz (30)	Camp Wood, Texas	A sheriff's deputy responded to a call about an argument at a motel. On arriving, he found that Musquiz was attempting to take her niece away from her brother. The deputy told Musquiz she did not have custody and would have to desist. Musquiz got a gun out of her car and fired at the deputy, who returned fire.
2018-01-02	Ronald Elliot (49)	Ozark, Arkansas	Police dispatched to a domestic disturbance found Elliot locked in his bedroom, armed with a gun. When they entered, they told him to drop the weapon but ended up shooting him.
2018-01-02	Louis C. Miller (66)	Joplin, Missouri	Sheriff's deputies were serving papers on Miller when he pulled a knife, so they called for backup. After more deputies arrived, Miller attacked one of them with the knife, and the deputies shot him.
2018-01-01	Derrick Staton (16)	Brandywine, Maryland	A vehicle being driven by a Metro Transit Police K-9 officer struck and killed a pedestrian. Few details were immediately released.
2018-01-01	Mark Steven Parkinson (65)	Rossville, Georgia	A 911 caller said a woman was threatening to kill herself and her children. When deputies arrived, they called out to residents several times. The deputies saw Parkinson (the woman's father) inside the home pointing a gun at them through a window, and shot him.
2018-01-01	Archie Lawhon III (42)	Romance, Arkansas	Two men were found shot. Police searching the area found Lawhon (the brother of one of the men) in some nearby woods, armed with a gun. When he pointed it at them, they shot him.
2018-01-01	Gary Johns (65)	Edgewater, Volusia County, Florida	Neighbors called police at around 10 p.m. after hearing gunshots from the home of Gary and Karen Johns. Edgewater police had just arrived on the scene when they said they heard a gunshot and saw Karen Johns run screaming out of her house. She was followed by her husband who was armed with a handgun and was shooting at his wife, police said. Officers ordered Gary to drop his weapon. When he refused and continued chasing Karen, they opened fire.

== See also ==
- Death in custody § United States
- Henry A. Wallace Police Crime Public Database
- List of cases of police brutality
- List of countries with annual rates and counts for killings by law enforcement officers
- List of law enforcement officers killed in the line of duty in the United States
- List of law enforcement officers convicted for an on-duty killing in the United States
- List of shootings by US immigration agents
- List of police reforms related to the George Floyd protests
- List of unarmed African Americans killed by law enforcement officers in the United States
- Lists of killings by law enforcement officers
- Police brutality in the United States
- Police misconduct § United States
- Police riot § United States
- Police use of deadly force in the United States
