= Killing of John Albers =

2018 police killing in Overland Park, Kansas

- Date: January 20, 2018
- Location: Overland Park, Kansas, U.S.
- Type: police killing by shooting
- Participants: Overland Park Police officer Clayton Jenison
- Deaths: John Albers
- Inquiries: Federal Bureau of Investigation
- Litigation: Albers v. Overland Park, Kansas

On January 20, 2018, John Albers, a 17-year old male, was shot and killed by an Overland Park Police officer responding to a report of a suicidal male.

== The killing ==
On January 20, 2018, a friend of 17-year-old John Albers called 911 to report that Albers had "been taking pills and drinking" and that "[he] was done with life and threatened to hurt himself". When the officers arrived at the Albers residence, they waited outside the house for a few minutes before waiting for other officers before approaching. Officer Jenison parked down the street, walked up to the house, walked in the front yard, and was approaching the garage door when it began to open. Albers had opened the garage and was backing out of his garage in his mom's Honda Odyssey minivan. Officer Jenison fired 13 rounds. The van then rolled down the driveway and into the street before stopping across the street in another house's front yard. The officers then approached the van to give aid to John following the shooting, but the injuries would prove to be fatal. John Albers was declared dead on the scene and had been shot multiple times by Jenison.

== Litigation ==
Albers's parents filed a federal lawsuit against Jenison and the City of Overland Park. The city initially attempted to get the case dismissed; however, their motion was denied. In January 2019, his parents announced they had agreed to a $2.3 million settlement from the city.

== Jenison resignation ==
Jenison resigned from the department in March 2018. He received an $81,040 buyout package, which included $70,000 for severance pay and an additional $11,040 for his regular salary. Jenison was cleared of criminal wrongdoing by Johnson County District Attorney Steve Howe and Overland Park Police Chief Frank Donchez.

== FBI civil rights investigation ==
On September 22, 2020, the FBI opened a federal civil rights investigation into the incident. The FBI closed the investigation almost two years later with no additional action.

== Open letter from MORE2 ==
On April 26, 2021, several faith leaders with the Metropolitan Organization for Racial and Economic Equality (stylized "MORE2", pronounced "MORE-squared") joined Sheila Albers in a press conference calling for the termination of Chief Frank Donchez. They expressed an overall "lack of confidence in the leadership of our police". Ms. Albers said that she and her husband had "listened to city leadership engage in telling lies or omitting information" for 3 1/2 years. The MORE2 open letter stated that "when threats from white nationalists emerged [in July 2020], Donchez chose to crack down on protestors rather than to stand up to extremists. We cannot accept bending to the demands of white nationalists." It was also reported that white nationalists had complained to the police about nonviolent protestors they called "terrorists", after which the Overland Park police arrested three black men and one white woman at a subsequent nonviolent protest, charging one of the black men with a felony. City Councilman Chris Newlin added, "The Chief mentioned that Proud Boys were going to show up. It was unfortunate that protestors were arrested." At the time of this MORE2 press conference, one of those white nationalists was reportedly "in custody for his role in the [January 6, 2021] attack on our own Capitol".

== Chief Donchez resignation ==
On September 12, 2023, Donchez resigned with no official reason given, though the City shared an email from Sheila Albers, John's mother, complaining that Chief Donchez approached her during a City Council meeting the evening before, asking to dialog with her. She said Donchez had told a reporter a full year after the incident that Officer Jenison had left the force "within a week or two" after the incident. She later learned that Jenison had received a $70,000 severance package in March 2018, though Donchez had told a reporter that Jenison had left "within a week or two" after the incident, not over a month later. Ms. Albers said that "John struggled with his mental health." Chief Donchez replied, "And you left him at his time of need." A subsequent report said that Overland Park City Manager Lori Curtis Luther had "begun the termination" process, but Donchez resigned before she could complete it.

== See also ==
- List of killings by law enforcement officers in the United States, January 2018
