= Sex differences in stroke care =

This article describes disparities existing between men and women in accessing and receiving care for a stroke. This article also describes factors outside of the health care system which contribute to this disparity.

== Disparity in accessing care ==
Among patients greater than 50 years of age, women appear less likely than men to be admitted to the ICU. Also, women experience longer waiting times in the emergency department than men.

== Disparity in symptom recognition/diagnosis ==
There are marked differences in the clinical symptom presentation of stroke between men and women.

Women who suffer an acute stroke are more likely to present with non-traditional and non-neurological stroke symptoms, for example chest pain and/or shortness of breath. More atypical symptoms in women may result in a delayed diagnosis, longer in-hospital delays, and less aggressive rt-PA treatment.

== Disparity in treatment ==
Research findings indicate that physicians treat women experiencing stroke less aggressively than they treat men experiencing stroke. Women with cardiovascular disease, as an example, are less frequently offered invasive procedures when compared with their male counterparts.

The use of rt-PA (Recombinant Tissue Plasminogen Activator), a protein enzyme that helps break up blood clots, is a common treatment for stroke. Research indicates that women have between 22% and 30% lower odds of receiving rt-PA treatment for acute stroke than men. When comparing the treatment of men and women with acute stroke, research has found that women are consistently less likely to receive thrombolytic (blood clot dissolving) treatments, despite findings indicating that women experiencing stroke benefit more than men from thrombolytic treatment.

Between 1997 and 2006, women hospitalized for acute ischemic stroke (AIS) were less likely to receive cerebro-vascular and cardiac reperfusion/revascularization therapies, intravenous tPA (Tissue Plasminogen Activator to break up clots), catheter angiography (imaging of blood vessels), angioplasty/stent (opening of blocked blood vessels), and carotid endarterectomy (surgical removal of plaque).

== Non health-system factors contributing to sex disparity ==
=== Employer-sponsored health insurance and the employment gap ===
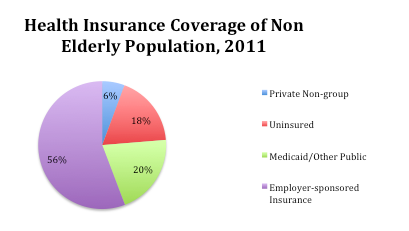
Chart made from data collected by the Kaiser Family Foundation

Women do not access health insurance at the rate of men because women are less likely to be employed than men, there are fewer women in the workforce than men, and women are more likely to work part-time than men.

In the United States, the current standard for acquiring health coverage by an individual and their family is through a group plan made available by an employer. As of a 2011 study by the Kaiser Family Foundation, 55.8% of Americans access health coverage through their employer, 20.5% depend on public programs such as Medicaid and Medicare, 5.7% access coverage through a private non-group, and the remaining 18% are uninsured.

Even for those individuals who are covered by employer-based plans, women remain disproportionately underinsured, meaning that their medical expenses after insurance (and excluding premiums) represent 10 percent or more of their incomes. Twelve percent of insured individuals, between the ages of 19 and 64, are underinsured, and of that group, women paid 16 percent of their income to health care costs, compared with 9 percent paid by men.

These factors may make females less likely to seek care because of possible financial strain.
