= Silvia Sara Canetto =

Psychology professor

- Occupation: Professor at Colorado State University
- Awards: 2020 Louis I. Dublin Award, American Association of Suicidology; 2019 APA Society for the Psychology of Women Heritage Award; 2018 APA Denmark-Reuder Award

Academic background
- Education: (1977) University of Padova (1983) The Hebrew University of Jerusalem (1987) Northwestern University Medical School

Academic work
- Institutions: Colorado State University

Silvia Sara Canetto is an Italian-American psychologist known for her research in diversity issues (including gender, sexual orientation, and social economic status) related to suicidal behaviors, aging, and end of life. She is a professor of applied social health psychology, and counseling psychology at Colorado State University (CSU).

Canetto is a Fellow of the Association for Psychological Science, the Gerontological Society of America, and the American Psychological Association (APA) (Society for the Psychology of Women, Division of International Psychology, Society of Counseling Psychology, Division of Trauma Psychology, Division of Adult Development and Aging, and Society for the Psychological Study of Men and Masculinities).

Canetto co-edited Focus on women. Women and suicidal behavior with David Lester, and Review of Suicidology with Ronald W. Maris and Morton M. Silverman.

== Biography ==
Canetto was born and raised in Italy.

Canetto completed a Clinical Psychology Internship at Ferrara Mental Health Services and Padova Psychiatric Hospital and received a Doctor of Psychology degree in the field of Experimental/Physiological Psychology from the University of Padova in 1977.

Between 1977 and 1980, Canetto was a post-doctoral researcher at the Hebrew University of Jerusalem and the Department of Oral Biology at the Hadassah Hospital in Israel. In 1983 Canetto received her M.A. in General Psychology at the Hebrew University of Jerusalem under the mentorship of Judith R. Ganchrow and Ruth Guttman. From 1984 to 1985 she completed a Clinical Psychology internship at Michael Reese Hospital and Medical Center. In 1987 she received a Ph.D. in Clinical Psychology, with a focus on older adults at Northwestern University Medical School under the supervision of David Gutmann.

Between 1988 and 1991, Canetto was a visiting Assistant Professor at the University of Montana and the University of Vermont. She joined Colorado State University in 1991 and is affiliated with the Women's Interdisciplinary Studies, and Human Development and Family Studies Program. Since 2003 she has been a Full Professor at the Department of Psychology in Colorado State University. In 2007 she became an Affiliate Faculty of the Psychology Doctoral Program in Escuela de Postgrado (Graduate School) Pontificia Universidad Católica del Perú.

== Research ==
Canetto runs the Canetto Research Team at Colorado State University with a focus on gender and cultural diversity. One of her interests focuses on cultural norms, stereotypes, and gender narratives for persistence, and success in science, technology, math and engineering (STEM). In longitudinal study of underrepresented individuals (e.g., women, low SES, and specific ethnic minorities) in the STEM major, Canetto suggests that mentoring programs may help increase academic self-efficacy of women and individuals with STEM-minority status at graduation.

Another area of interest relates to cultural norms and diversity of gender and suicidal behaviors. Other areas of interest includes stereotypes of gender, aging and sexual orientation; and cultural and gender issues in human rights.

== Representative publications ==
- Canetto, S. S. (1993). She died for love and he for glory: Gender myths of suicidal behavior. OMEGA-Journal of Death and Dying, 26(1), 1-17.
- Canetto, S. S. (1997). Meanings of gender and suicidal behavior during adolescence. Suicide and Life‐Threatening Behavior, 27(4), 339–351. ISSN 0363-0234. PMID 9444729.
- Canetto, S. S., & Lester, D. (1998). Gender, culture, and suicidal behavior. Transcultural Psychiatry, 35(2), 163-190.
- Canetto, S. S., & Sakinofsky, I. (1998). The gender paradox in suicide. Suicide and Life‐Threatening Behavior, 28(1), 1-23.
- Canetto, S. S. (2008). Women and suicidal behavior: A cultural analysis. American Journal of Orthopsychiatry, 78(2), 259–266.

== Awards ==
- 1997 Shneidman Award from the American Association of Suicidology for outstanding contributions to suicide research
- 2006 CSU Margaret B. Hazaleus Award
- 2007 LUMA Award of the Association of Women in Psychology for best lesbian psychologies scholarly manuscript (with Sara L. Wright)
- 2008-2009 CSU Cermak Excellence in Advising Award
- 2010 Strickland Henderson-Daniel Distinguished Mentoring Award from the APA Society for the Psychology of Women
- 2018 APA Denmark-Reuder Award for outstanding international contributions to the psychology of women and gender
- 2019 Denmark-Gunvald Award for feminist research and service from the International Council of Psychologists
- 2019 Heritage Award from the APA Society for the Psychology of Women for long-standing, distinguished contributions to women and gender research, teaching, and service
- 2020 Louis I. Dublin Award from the American Association of Suicidology
