= HeadsUpGuys =

Mental health organization in Canada

- Formation: 2015
- Founder: Dr. John Ogrodniczuk
- Headquarters: Vancouver
- Parent organization: University of British Columbia
- Website: https://www.headsupguys.org

HeadsUpGuys is a Canada-based online resource and research program focused on supporting men's mental health, with an emphasis on managing depression and preventing male deaths by suicide. Launched in 2015, the initiative provides self-help tools, personal accounts, and professional resources tailored to men, aiming to reduce stigma and promote early help-seeking.

== History ==
HeadsUpGuys was launched in 2015 by Dr. John Ogrodniczuk, Professor of Psychiatry and Director of the Psychotherapy Program at the University of British Columbia. The initiative was prompted by findings from a waiting-room survey in which many men reported having suicidal thoughts but did not discuss them with their physicians. In response, Ogrodniczuk created HeadsUpGuys as an anonymous online resource specifically tailored to men experiencing depression.

Since its launch, the website has expanded to include a range of features, including a therapist directory (introduced in 2021) and a suite of psychometrically validated mental health screening tools (added in 2024).

== Features ==
The site offers free tools and information to help men address mental health concerns:

=== Self-Check-Suite ===
The site launched with a "Self Check", based on the PHQ-9 depression scale, which enables visitors to screen for symptoms of depression. As of 2025, the check has been completed over 500,000 times. In 2018, a "Stress Test" was introduced, which helps users identify, prioritize, and track sources of stress. In 2024, with support of West Fraser Timber, the Self-Check Suite was expanded to include additional screening tools addressing anger, loneliness, relationship challenges, financial strain, workplace distress, and lack or purpose or meaning. Each tool provides tailored feedback and guidance based on user responses.

=== Therapist Directory ===
Introduced in 2021, the therapist directory lists over 800 qualified mental health professionals across Canada, the United States, the United Kingdom, Australia, and Ireland. It also offers guidance for men who are new to therapy, including suggestions for initiating contact with a therapist, discussing concerns with a family doctor or general practitioner, and understanding what to expect from talk therapy.

=== Recovery Stories ===
HeadsUpGuys features over 100 personal accounts from men who have navigated challenges such as depression, anxiety, grief, suicidal thoughts, and addiction. These stories aim to provide insight, reduce stigma, and offer peer-based encouragement.

=== Articles and Courses ===
The site includes informational articles on self-care, help-seeking, supporting others, managing negative thoughts, maintaining healthy relationships, identifying symptoms of depression in friends or family members, and other topics in support of men's mental health.

In 2023, self-guided courses were added, covering cognitive behavioral therapy, mindfulness, managing anger and irritability, and building relationship skills. These courses are self-paced and designed to be broadly accessible. Over 700 course completions had been recorded by 2025.

== Impact and Outreach ==
As of 2025, the site has received over 5 million visits, with more than 500,000 completions of its depression screener and 20,000 therapist connections initiated through the site. A 2016 survey of site visitors found that:

- 74% felt they could better recognise symptoms of depression
- 64% reported feeling less alone in their experience of suicidal thoughts
- 72% indicated an increased sense of hope for recovery.

HeadsUpGuys has been featured in numerous media outlets, including Forbes and The Telegraph in March 2016, Men's Health magazine in December 2016, Global News in November 2019, and The National on CBC News in February 2020,

Outreach campaigns have included:

- A 2019 campaign in the Wisconsin counties of Forest, Oneida, and Vilas, which distributed coasters in bars with links to HeadsUpGuys and crisis lines.
- A 2024 "40 Hours of 40K" tabletop gaming fundraiser in Edmonton, inspired by the UK event of the same name. Artists and tabletop gamers from across Canada and the United States painted Warhammer 40,000 armies and competed in a 40-hour tournament to raise funds and awareness.
- A recurring "Sip Around the World" whiskey tasting event in Vancouver, which has raised $341,500 since 2023.

A suicide prevention video PSA directed by Oleksandr Herasymenko for the site reached over 330,000 views in two months on YouTube in 2025.

== Research ==
In addition to offering public resources, HeadsUpGuys supports research efforts in men's mental health, and has contributed to over 80 peer-reviewed publications as of 2025.

Data from the website has been used in several academic studies, including:

- Genuchi, M. C., Ogrodniczuk, J. S., Oliffe, J. L., Walther, A., Kealy, D., Rice, S. M., & Seidler, Z. E. (2025). The role of feeling understood in men's loneliness-depression pathway: Longitudinal findings over three assessment waves. Journal of Psychiatric Research, 183, 47–51. https://doi.org/10.1016/j.jpsychires.2025.01.057
- Ogrodniczuk, J. S., Sivagurunathan, M., Kealy, D., Rice, S. M., Seidler, Z. E., & Oliffe, J. L. (2023). Suicidal ideation among men during COVID‐19: Examining the roles of loneliness, thwarted belongingness, and personality impairment. Scandinavian Journal of Psychology, 64(4), 401–408. https://doi.org/10.1111/sjop.12904
- Ogrodniczuk, J. S., Rice, S. M., Kealy, D., Seidler, Z. E., Delara, M., & Oliffe, J. L. (2021). Psychosocial impact of the COVID-19 pandemic: A cross-sectional study of online help-seeking Canadian men. Postgraduate Medicine, 133(7), 750–759. https://doi.org/10.1080/00325481.2021.1873027
- Simard, A. A. P., Seidler, Z. E., Oliffe, J. L., Rice, S. M., Kealy, D., Walther, A., & Ogrodniczuk, J. S. (2022). Job satisfaction and psychological distress among help-seeking men: Does meaning in life play a role? Behavioral Sciences, 12(3), 58. https://doi.org/10.3390/bs12030058
- Ogrodniczuk, J. S., Beharry, J., & Oliffe, J. L. (2021). An evaluation of 5-year web analytics for HeadsUpGuys: A Men's depression E-mental health resource. American Journal of Men's Health, 15(6), 15579883211063322-15579883211063322. https://doi.org/10.1177/15579883211063322
- Seidler, Z. E., Rice, S. M., Kealy, D., Oliffe, J. L., & Ogrodniczuk, J. S. (2020). Getting them through the door: A survey of Men's facilitators for seeking mental health treatment. International Journal of Mental Health and Addiction, 18(5), 1346–1351. https://doi.org/10.1007/s11469-019-00147-5
- Seidler, Z. E., Rice, S. M., Kealy, D., Oliffe, J. L., & Ogrodniczuk, J. S. (2020). What gets in the way? Men's perspectives of barriers to mental health services. International Journal of Social Psychiatry, 66(2), 105–110. https://doi.org/10.1177/0020764019886336

== See also ==
- List of suicide crisis lines
- Men's health
- Suicide prevention
- Gender-role stress
- Knowledge translation
- Loneliness epidemic
