= Men's health =

Broad subject that encompasses all facets of men's health

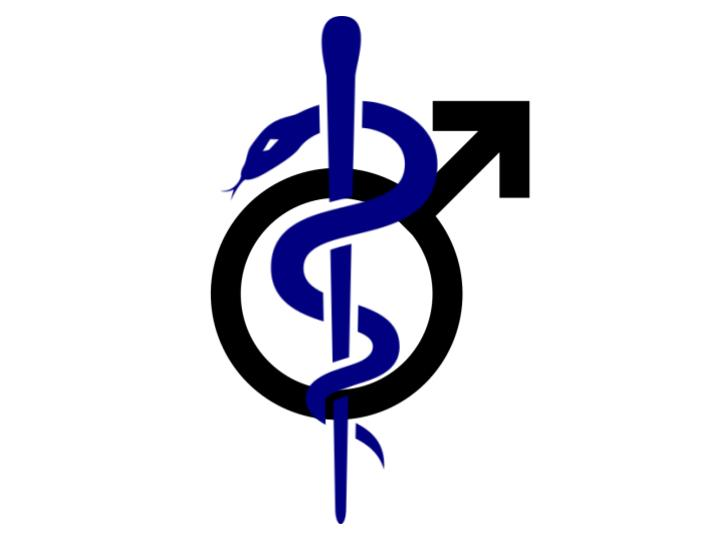
A symbol of men's health. The Rod of Asclepius (blue) overlaying the male gender symbol (black).

Men's health is a state of complete physical, mental, and social well-being as experienced by men, and not merely the absence of disease. Differences in men's health compared to women's can be attributed to biological factors, behavioral factors, and social factors (e.g., occupations).

Men's health often relates to biological factors such as the male reproductive system or conditions caused by hormones specific to, or most notable in, males. Some conditions that affect both men and women, such as cancer, and injury, manifest differently in men. Some diseases that affect both sexes are statistically more common in men. In terms of behavioral factors, men are more likely to make unhealthy or risky choices and less likely to seek medical care.

Men may face issues not directly related to their biology, such as gender-differentiated access to medical treatment and other socioeconomic factors. Outside Subsaharan Africa, men are at greater risk of HIV/AIDS. This is associated with unsafe sexual activity that is often nonconsensual.

== Definition ==
Men's health refers to the state of physical, mental, and social wellbeing of men, and encompasses a wide range of issues that are unique to men or that affect men differently than women. This can include issues related to reproductive health, sexual health, cardiovascular health, mental health, and cancer prevention and treatment. Men's health also encompasses lifestyle factors such as diet, exercise, and stress management, as well as access to healthcare and preventative measures.

== Life expectancy ==
Despite overall increases in life expectancy globally, men's life expectancy is less than that of women, regardless of race and geographic region. The global gap between the life expectancy of men and women has remained at approximately 4.4 years since 2016, according to the WHO. Life expectancy is a statistical measure that represents the average number of years that a person is expected to live, based on the current mortality rates. It is typically calculated at birth and can vary depending on factors such as gender, race, and location. For example, life expectancy in many developed countries is higher than in developing countries, and life expectancy for women is generally higher than for men.

However, the gap does vary based on country, with low-income countries having a smaller gap in life expectancy. Biological, behavioral, and social factors contribute to a lower overall life expectancy in men; however, the individual importance of each factor is not known. Overall attitudes towards health differ by gender. Men are generally less likely to be proactive in seeking healthcare, resulting in poorer health outcomes.

Global comparison of life expectancy of men vs women in different countries

Men are difficult to recruit for health promotion interventions. The value of adopting a gender-sensitive approach to engage and retain men in health promotion interventions has been reported.

Biological influences on lower male life expectancies include genetics and hormones. For males, the 23rd pair of chromosomes are an X and a Y chromosome, rather than the two X chromosomes in females. The Y chromosome is smaller in size and contains fewer genes. This distinction may contribute to the discrepancy between men's and women's life expectancy, as the additional X chromosome in females may counterbalance potential disease-producing genes from the other X chromosome. Since males don't have the second X chromosome, they lack this potential protection. Hormonally, testosterone is a major male sex hormone important for several functions in males, and to a lesser extent, females. Low testosterone in males is a risk factor of cardiovascular-related diseases. Conversely, high testosterone levels can contribute to prostate diseases. These hormonal factors play a direct role in the life expectancy of men compared to women.

In terms of behavioral factors, men have higher levels of consumption of alcohol, substances, and tobacco compared to women, resulting in increased rates of diseases such as lung cancer, cardiovascular disease, and cirrhosis of the liver. Sedentary behavior, associated with many chronic diseases seems to be more prevalent in men. These diseases influence the overall life expectancy of men. For example, according to the World Health Organization, 3.14 million men died from causes linked to excessive alcohol use in 2010 compared to 1.72 million women. Men are more likely than women to engage in over 30 risky behaviors associated with increased morbidity, injury, and mortality. Additionally, despite a disproportionately lower rate of suicide attempts than women, men have significantly higher rates of death by suicide.

Social determinants of men's health involve factors such as greater levels of occupational exposure to physical and chemical hazards than women. Historically, men had higher work-related stress, which negatively impacted their life expectancy by increasing the risk of hypertension, heart attack, and stroke. However, as women's role in the workplace continues to be established, these risks are no longer specific to just men.

== Mental health ==
=== Stress ===
Although most stress symptoms are similar in men and women, stress can be experienced differently by men. The American Psychological Association says that men are not as likely to report emotional and physical symptoms of stress compared to women. While this may be because men do not wish to be seen as weak, a Canadian study found that men tend to not share distress with doctors independently of their conformity to male norms. They say men are more likely to withdraw socially when stressed and are more likely to report doing nothing to manage their stress. Men are more likely than women to cite that work is a source of stress; women are more likely to report that money and the economy are a source of stress.

Mental stress in men is associated with various complications which can affect men's health: high blood pressure and subsequent cardiovascular morbidity and mortality, cardiovascular disease, erectile dysfunction (impotence) and possibly reduced fertility (due to reduced libido and frequency of intercourse).

Fathers experience stress during the time shortly before and after the time of birth (perinatal period). Stress levels tend to increase from the prenatal period up until the time of birth, and then decrease from the time of birth to the later postnatal period. Factors that contribute to stress in fathers include negative feelings about the pregnancy, role restrictions related to becoming a father, fear of childbirth, and feelings of incompetence related to infant care. This stress negatively impacts fathers. Higher levels of stress in fathers are associated with mental health issues such as anxiety, depression, psychological distress, and fatigue.

=== Substance use disorders ===
Substance use disorder and alcohol use disorder can be defined as a pattern of harmful use of substances for mood-altering purposes. Alcohol is one of the most common substances used in excess, and men are up to twice as likely to develop alcohol use disorder than women. Gender differences in alcohol consumption remain universal, although the sizes of gender differences vary. More drinking and heaving, binge drinking occurs in men, whereas more long-term abstention occurs in women. Moreover, men are more likely to abuse substances such as drugs, with a lifetime prevalence of 11.5% in men compared to 6.4% in women, in the United States. Additionally, males are more likely to be substance addicts and abuse substances due to peer pressure compared to females.

==== Risks ====
Substance and alcohol use disorders are associated with various mental health issues in men and women. Mental health problems are not only a result from drinking excess alcohol; they can also cause people to drink too much. A major reason for consuming alcohol is to change mood or mental state. Alcohol can temporarily alleviate feelings of anxiety and depression, and some people use it as a form of self-medication in an attempt to counteract these negative feelings. However, alcohol consumption can worsen existing mental health problems. Evidence shows that people who consume high amounts of alcohol or use illicit substances are vulnerable to an increased risk of developing mental health problems. Men with mental health disorders, like post-traumatic stress disorder, are twice as likely as women to develop a substance use disorder.

==== Treatment ====
There have been identified gender differences in seeking treatment for mental health and substance abuse disorders between men and women. Women are more likely to seek help from and disclose mental health problems to their primary care physicians, whereas men are more likely to seek specialist and inpatient care. Men are more likely than women to disclose problems with alcohol use to their health care provider. In the United States, there are more men than women in treatment for substance use disorders. Both men and women receive better mental health outcomes with early treatment interventions.

=== Suicide ===
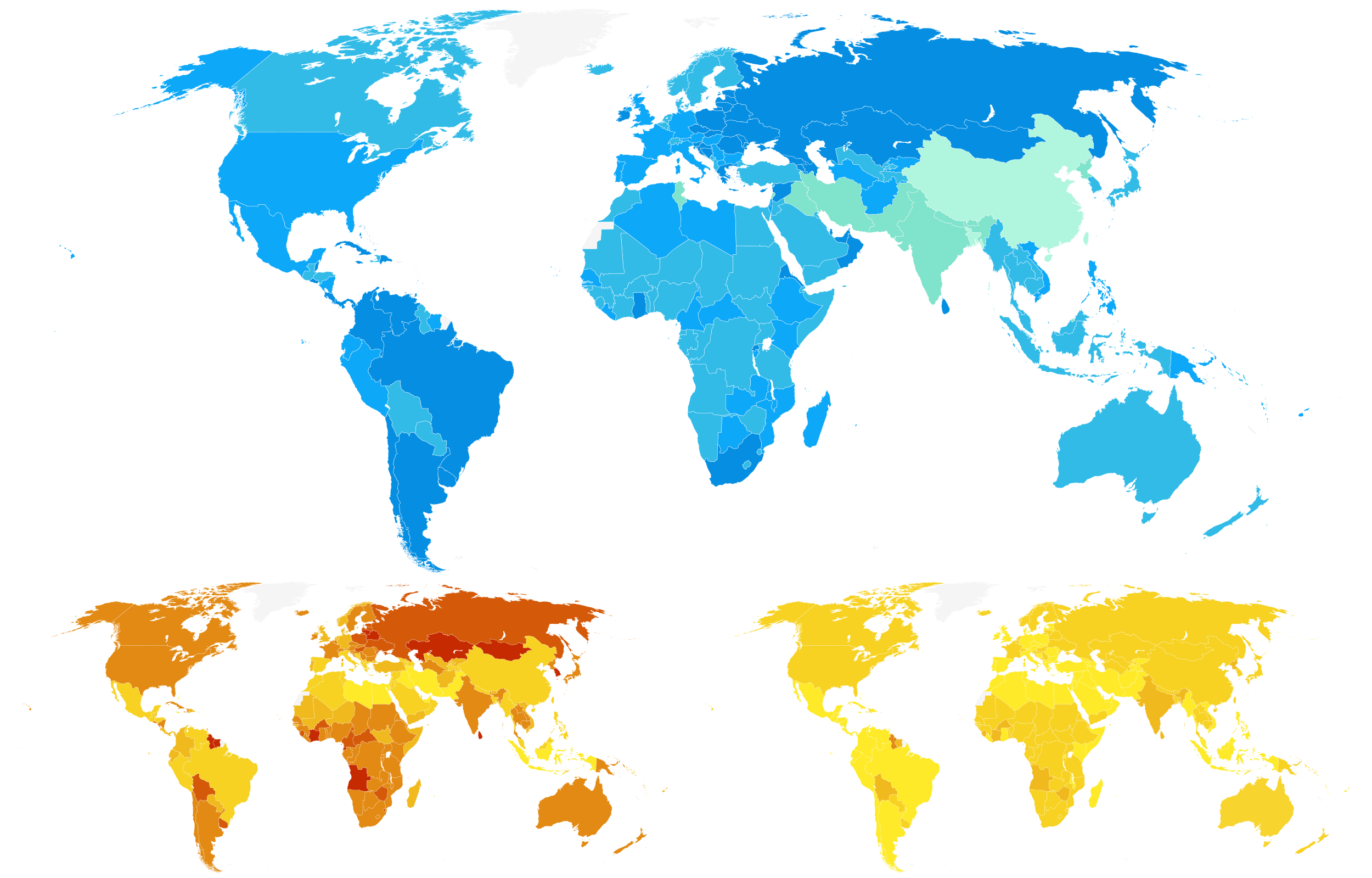
World Health Organization: Global Male-Female age standardized suicide rates (2015)

Suicide has a high incidence rate in men but often lacks public awareness. Suicide is the 13th leading cause of death globally, and in most parts of the world, men are significantly more likely to die by suicide than women, although women are significantly more likely to attempt suicide. This is known as the "gender paradox of suicidal behavior". Worldwide, the ratio of suicide deaths was 1.8:1 men per woman in 2016 according to the World Health Organization. This gender disparity varies greatly between countries. For example, in the United Kingdom and Australia, this men/women ratio is approximately 3:1, and in the United States, Russia, and Argentina approximately 4:1. In South Africa, the suicide rate amongst men is five times greater than women. In East Asian countries however, the gender gap in suicide rates are relatively smaller, with men to women ratios ranging from 1:1 to 2:1. Multiple factors exist to explain this gender gap in suicide rates, such as men more frequently completing high mortality actions such as hanging, carbon-monoxide poisoning, and the use of lethal weapons. Additional factors that contribute to the disparity in suicide rates between men and women include the pressures of traditional gender roles for men in society and the socialization of men in society.

==== Risk factors ====
Because variations exist in the risk factors associated with suicidal behavior between men and women, they contribute to the discrepancy in suicide rates. Suicide is complex and cannot simply be attributed to a single cause; however, there are psychological, social, and psychiatric factors to consider.

Mental illness is a major risk factor for suicide for both men and women. Common mental illnesses that are associated with suicide include depression, bipolar disorder, schizophrenia, and substance abuse disorders. In addition to mental illness, psychosocial factors such as unemployment and occupational stress are established risk factors for men. Alcohol use disorder is a risk factor that is much more prevalent in men than in women, which increases risks of depression and impulsive behaviors. This problem is exacerbated in men, as they are twice as likely as women to develop alcohol use disorder.

Reluctance to seek help is another prevalent risk factor facing men, stemming from internalized notions of masculinity. Traditional masculine stereotypes place expectations of strength and stoic, while any indication of vulnerability, such as consulting mental health services, is perceived as weak and emasculating. As a result, depression is under-diagnosed in men and may often remain untreated, which may lead to suicide.

==== Warning signs ====
Identifying warning signs is important for reducing suicide rates worldwide, particularly for men, as distress may be expressed in a manner that is not easily discernable. For instance, depression, and suicidal thoughts may manifest in the form of anger, hostility, and irritability. Additionally, risktaking and avoidance behaviors may be demonstrated more commonly in men.

== Sex differences ==
The following is a list of diseases or conditions that have a higher prevalence in men relative to women.

Cardiovascular conditions:

- Cardiovascular disease
- Atherosclerosis
- Heart attack
- Hypertension
- Stroke (Sex differences in stroke care)
- High cholesterol

Respiratory conditions:

- Respiratory disease
- COPD
- Lung cancer
- Pneumonia

Mental health conditions:

- Autism (Sex and gender differences in autism)
- Major depressive disorder
- Suicide
- Addiction

Cancer:

- Prostate cancer
- Testicular cancer
- Colorectal cancer
- Skin cancer

Sexual health:

- HIV/AIDS
- Erectile dysfunction
- Ejaculation Disorders
- Hypoactive sexual desire disorder

Other:

- Unintentional injuries
- Diabetes
- Influenza
- Liver disease
- Kidney disease
- Alcohol abuse

== See also ==
- Andrology
- Health survival paradox
- International Journal of Men's Health
- International Men's Day November 19
- Male infertility
- Movember
- HeadsUpGuys
- National Prostate Cancer Awareness Month
- Paternal age effect
- Sex differences in human physiology
- Sex differences in medicine
- Sex differences in psychology
- Sex differences in schizophrenia
