= Tacheback =

Tacheback was the name of a UK charitable event that ran each November from 2003 to 2010. During that month each year, thousands of men would grow a sponsored moustache to raise money for the Everyman Campaign, a UK male cancer research charity which funds research in and awareness of male prostate and testicular cancers. The event name is a portmanteau word, being a mix of CashBack and Tache (Moustache).

The event culminated with a “Tashon Parade” in London of some of its annual sponsored mustachioed participants. The event was regularly attended by celebrities such as comedian Charlie Higson, satirist writer Michael "Atters" Attree, presenter Sarah Champion and numerous cover models, beauty queens, popular singers and footballers such as Craig Easton.

In 2010 it merged with Movember.
