= Mustache March =

United States Air Force annual event

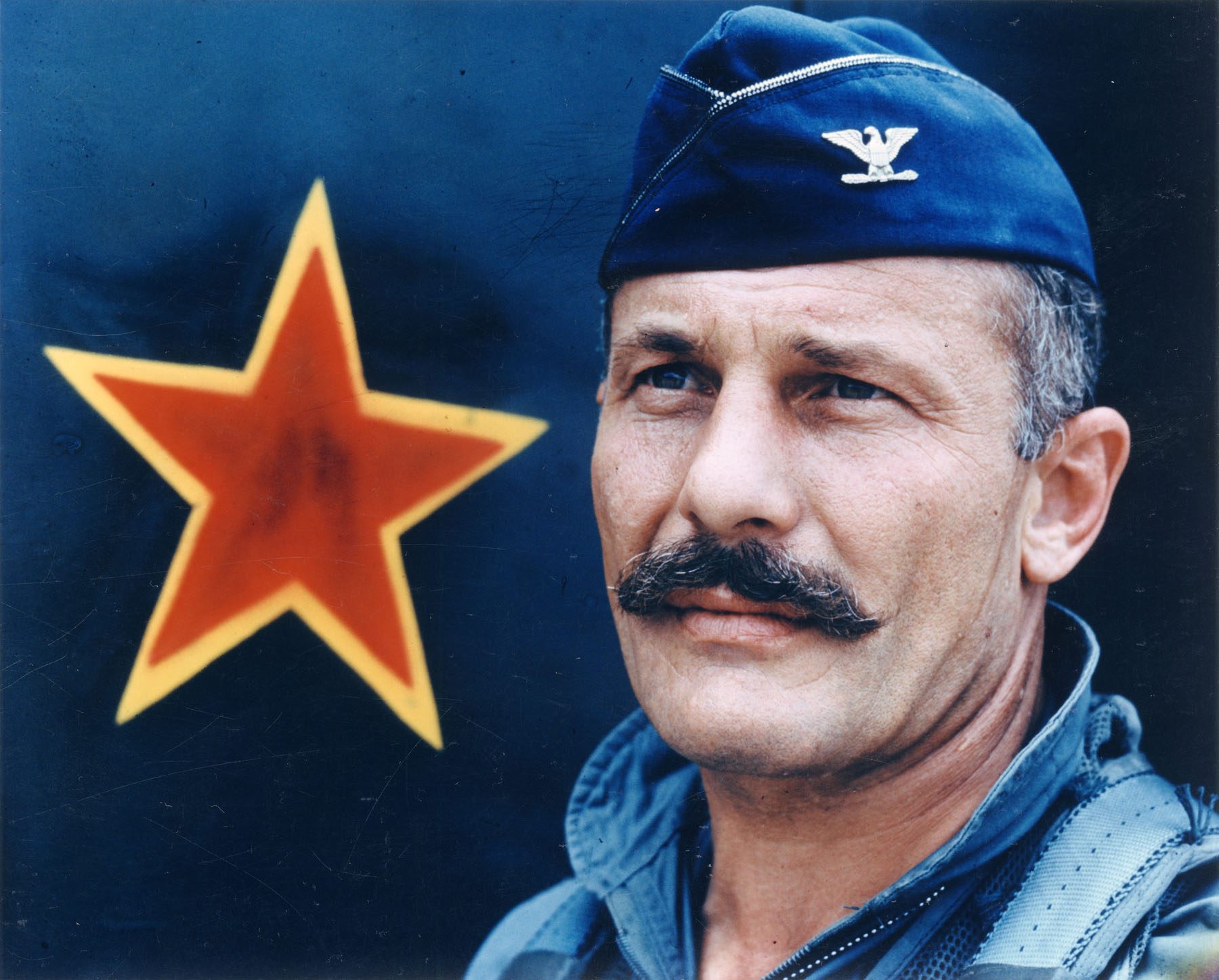
Col. Robin Olds sporting his trademark handlebar mustache during the Vietnam War

Mustache March is an annual event occurring in the month of March, where members in the United States Air Force grow mustaches to honor Air Force legend Robin Olds. As the name implies, it starts on 1 March and any participant who starts in the month of February is disqualified.

The idea stems from an early Air Force tradition in which members of the U.S. Air Force would grow mustaches in good-natured protest against facial hair regulations during the month of March. The act of growing a mustache as a gesture of defiance against dogmatic leadership is attributed to U.S. Air Force triple-ace Robin Olds, who grew an extravagantly waxed handlebar mustache which did not comply with U.S. Air Force regulations.

== Origins ==
A report on Mustache March by Adam Harder, 36th Wing Public Affairs, 2013

Aside from being a triple ace, Robin Olds was known for the extravagantly waxed, and decidedly non-regulation handlebar mustache he sported in Vietnam. It was a common superstition among airmen to grow a "bulletproof mustache", but Olds also used his as "a gesture of defiance. The kids on base loved it. Most everybody grew a mustache." Olds started the mustache after the 1967 success of Operation Bolo, and let it grow beyond regulation length, because "It became the middle finger I couldn't raise in the PR photographs. The mustache became my silent last word in the verbal battles...with higher headquarters on rules, targets, and fighting the war."

Returning home marked the end of this flamboyance. When he reported to his first interview with Air Force Chief of Staff General John P. McConnell, McConnell walked up to him, stuck a finger under his nose and said, "Take it off." Olds replied, "Yes, sir."

For his part, Olds was not upset with the order, recalling:

"To tell the truth, I wasn't all that fond of the damned thing by then, but it had become a symbol for the men of the 8th Wing. I knew McConnell understood. During his visits to Ubon over the past year he had never referred to my breach of military standards, just seemed rather amused at the variety of 'staches sported by many of the troops. (It) was the most direct order I had received in twenty-four years of service."

The incident with the mustache is given credit as the impetus for a new Air Force tradition, "Mustache March", in which aircrew, aircraft maintainers, space operators, cyber operators and other Airmen worldwide show solidarity by a symbolic, albeit good-natured "protest" for one month, against Air Force facial hair regulations.

== 2014 Mustache March ==
Prior to Mustache March in 2014, Air Force Chief of Staff Gen. Mark Welsh issued a branch-wide challenge while addressing the Air Force Association's Air Warfare Symposium on February 20. Welsh said "I don’t think we’ve ever had an all-in Mustache March, have we?" and "I’m putting the smackdown on you guys. Air Force-wide Mustache March, MAJCOM competitions." During the event, Welsh wrote on his Facebook page "... we can have a little fun while we accomplish the mission".

Christina Olds, daughter of Robin Olds, has been visiting squadrons at various bases at the end of March in the past few years, to act as a "judge" for the mustache growing. "The results have been entertaining, to say the least," says Olds. "There hasn't been a mustache grown out of limits in the hundreds inspected, so the judging is always based upon 'best' effort and 'likely to be most improved'. The squadrons seem to love the good natured competition and even many of the women pilots will sport a fake mustache for the fun of it."

In 2014, Retired Navy Commander Sara Zak criticized Mustache March for failing to show "proper respect to all airmen" and having "perpetuated an environment conducive to sexual harassment". She commented in an interview that "Women have been in the military for so long and there are still feelings that, we’re not welcome." Zak issued complaints to the Air Force inspector general's office and Department of Defense inspector general's office, and asked that Welsh step down and rescind the challenge. The inspector general's office found insufficient basis to initiate a query.

== See also ==
- Movember
