= Suicide terminology =

Historically, suicide terminology has been rife with issues of nomenclature, connotation, and outcomes, and terminology describing suicide has often been defined differently depending on the purpose of the definition (e.g., medical, legal, administrative). A lack of agreed-upon nomenclature and operational definitions has complicated understanding. In 2007, attempts were made to reach some consensus. There is controversy regarding the phrase "to commit suicide" as some view it as implying negative moral judgment and having an association with criminal or sinful activity.

Copycat suicide refers to suicide using methods in emulation of another, previous suicide. A 2020 meta-analysis on media coverage of suicide found that, after deaths of celebrities from suicide were reported, number of suicide "appears to increase [...] by 8-18% in the next 1-2 months", and, when suicide method was provided, associated with an 18-44% increased risk of suicide by the same method.

== Terminology ==
=== Origin ===
The word suicide (latin: suicidio) was coined by the Spanish cistercian monk Juan Caramuel in his work Theologia moralis fundamentalis of 1652

"Evidence [...] suggests that suicide was devised by Sir Thomas Browne and first published in his book Religio Medici in 1643. Although little used at first, suicide had become established as noun and verb by the mid-18th century and was recognized by inclusion in Johnson's Dictionary."

=== Ideations ===
Suicidal ideation is any self-reported thoughts of engaging in suicide-related behavior. Subtypes of suicide-related ideations depend on the presence or absence of suicidal intent.

To have suicidal intent is to have suicide or deliberate self-killing as one's purpose. Intent refers to the aim, purpose, or goal of the behavior rather than the behavior itself. The term connotes a conscious desire or wish to leave or escape from life, and also connotes a resolve to act. This is contrasted with suicidal motivation, or the driving force behind ideation or intent, which need not be conscious.

Suicide-related ideation with no suicidal intention is when an individual has thoughts of engaging in suicide-related behavior but has no intention to do so. When an individual is unable to clarify whether suicidal intent was present or not, the term undetermined degree of suicidal intent is used. Suicide-related ideation with some suicidal intent is when an individual has thoughts of engaging in suicide-related behavior and possesses suicidal intent.

=== Communications ===
Suicide-related communications are any interpersonal act of imparting, conveying, or transmitting thoughts, wishes, desires, or intent for which there is evidence that the act of communication is not itself a self-inflicted behavior or self-injurious. This broad definition includes two subsets:

A suicide threat is any interpersonal action, verbal or nonverbal, without a direct self-injurious component, that a reasonable person would interpret as communicating or suggesting that suicidal behavior might occur in the near future. Type I is a passive or active threat with no associated suicidal intent; Type II is a passive or covert threat with an undetermined level of intent; and Type III is a passive or covert threat with some degree of suicidal intent.

A suicide plan is a proposed method of carrying out a design that will lead to a potentially self-injurious outcome; a systematic formulation of a program of action that has the potential for resulting in self-injury. Type I is the expression of a definite plan with no suicidal intent; Type II is a proposed method with an undetermined level of intent; Type III is a proposed method with some suicidal intent.

=== Behaviors ===
Suicide related behavior is a self-inflicted, potentially injurious behavior for which there is evidence either that: (a) the person wished to use the appearance of intending to kill themselves in order to attain some other end; or (b) the person intended at some undetermined or some known degree to kill themselves. Suicide-related behaviors can result in no injuries, injuries, or death. Suicide-related behaviors comprise self-harm, self-inflicted unintentional death, undetermined suicide-related behaviors, self-inflicted death with undetermined intent, suicide attempt, and suicide.

Self-harm is self-inflicted, potentially injurious behavior for which there is evidence that the person had no intent to die. Persons engage in self-harm behaviors for its own sake (e.g., to use pain as a focusing stimulant, or due to a condition like trichotillomania), or when they wish to use the appearance of intending to kill themselves in order to attain some other end (e.g., to seek help, to punish themselves or others, to receive attention, or to regulate negative moods). Suicidal gestures are suicide-related behaviors that are carried out without suicidal intent. It is considered a controversial term.

Self-harm type I and Type II result in no injury and nonfatal injury respectively, while Self-Inflicted Unintentional Death, often called accidental suicide, is self-harm that has resulted in death. It is defined as from self-inflicted injury, poisoning, or suffocation where there is evidence that there was no intent to die. This category includes those injuries or poisonings described as unintended or accidental. Undetermined Suicide-Related Behavior is self-injurious behavior for which the person is unable or reluctant to admit positively to the intent to die, which have resulted in no injuries, for Type I, and injuries, for Type II.

A suicide attempt is defined as a self-inflicted, potentially injurious behavior with a nonfatal outcome for which there is evidence of intent to die. Type I has no resultant injuries, regardless of the degree of injury or lethality of method, while Type II has resultant injuries. Self-Inflicted Death with Undetermined Intent is self-injurious behavior that has resulted in fatal injury and for which intent is either equivocal or unknown A suicide is a self-inflicted death with evidence of intent to die.

=== Attitudes and oppression ===
Suicidism is currently used in two meanings;

- "the quality or state of being suicidal"
- "... an oppressive system (stemming from non-suicidal perspectives) functioning at the normative, discursive, medical, legal, social, political, economic, and epistemic levels in which suicidal people experience multiple forms of injustice and violence..." Suicidal people can experience discrimination, stigmatization, exclusion, pathologization, and incarceration. They may be hospitalized and/or drugged without their consent, and have difficulties in finding jobs or housing, and have their parental rights revoked. Suicide is not seen as a positive human right, or suicidal people seen as having potentially valuable messages to convey.

== "Committing" suicide ==
According to Fairbairn in his philosophical study of suicide published in 1995, "The most common way of speaking about suicide is to talk of its being 'committed'." An article published in 2011 stated that, although committed suicide or similar descriptions continued to be the norm in the English language, the term committed associates death by suicide, or more accurately, death by mental illness, with criminal or sinful actions. Research has pointed out that this phrasing has become so entrenched in English vocabulary that it has gained "a naturalness which implies a deceptive harmlessness." Per reportingonsuicide.org,

Certain phrases and words can further stigmatize suicide, spread myths, and undermine suicide prevention objectives such as "committed suicide" or referring to suicide as "successful," "unsuccessful" or a "failed attempt." Instead use, "died by suicide" or "killed him/herself."

While common, Lebacqz & Englehardt argue that referring to suicide as an act "committed" is hazardous to ethical clarity. Others have also argued in favour of alternative language regarding suicide, both in the interest of moral and ethical precision, as well as scientific and clinical clarity. A United States Navy report urges against the use of the term committed suicide on similar grounds, asserting that "suicide is better understood when framed objectively within the context of behavioral health."

The lack of clarity in English suicide terminology has been attributed to the connotations of crime, dishonour, and sin that suicide may carry. Common language has been described as "[portraying] suicide as a 'crime' to be 'committed' as is, for example, murder." This is despite the fact that suicide is largely no longer a crime, and that, as noted suicidologist Samuel Wallace wrote, "all suicide is neither abhorrent nor not; insane or not; selfish or not; rational or not; justifiable or not."

Canadian suicide prevention activist, P. Bonny Ball, commented that the alleged criminal implications of suicide are a carryover from the Middle Ages when suicide was considered "both illegal and sinful by the laws and religions of the time."

Various alternatives have been proposed to alter the language regarding the act of suicide from a variety of sectors – including government, journalism, community mental health advocates, and the scientific community. Terms such as death by suicide have been suggested to be more objective. The World Health Organization has agreed that these terms "are more accurate and less open to misinterpretation."

As it applies to a direct clinical context, the widely cited Beck Classification of Suicidal Behaviour exclusively uses the terminology of complete suicide. This classification was revisited in a number of notable documents (such as the Operational Classification for Determination of Suicide, the 'Tower of Babel' nomenclature, the WHO/EURO definitions, the Columbia University suicidality classification, the Centers for Disease Control and Prevention self-directed violence surveillance system, and the Denver VA VISN 19 MIRECC self-directed violence classification system).

Advocacy groups have suggested a variety of guidelines for suicide terminology. As it concerns media reporting of suicide, a key indicator of guideline influence on language as it is practiced in that context reports including one by the Annenberg School for Communication's Public Policy Center at the University of Pennsylvania suggests that there is "evidence of a change in reporting practices following the release of the new media guidelines".

== See also ==
- Suicide attack § Definition and terminology
