= Mental health consumer =

Someone who utilizes mental health services

A mental health consumer (or mental health patient) is a person who is obtaining treatment or support for a mental disorder, also known as psychiatric or mental illness. The term was coined by people who use mental health services in an attempt to empower those with mental health issues, historically considered a marginalized segment of society. The term suggests that there is a reciprocal contract between those who provide a service and those who use a service and that individuals have a choice in their treatment and that without them there could not exist mental health providers.

== History ==
In the 1970s the term "patient" was most commonly used. Mental Health activists of the civil rights times recognized, as did many other groups seeking self-definition, that such labels are metaphors that reflect how identities are perceived and constructed. In particular, in the mental health field they shape the nature of the relationship between the giver and receiver of psychiatric services, be it one with an emphasis on reciprocity or hierarchy. Users of psychiatric services repulsed the efforts of experts to define them and sought to develop ways to define themselves. In Australia, informal support groups of people who had recovered from episodes of mental ill health were formed during the first wave of moving patients out of psychiatric hospitals into the community in the 1960s. In the USA and other countries, radical movements to change service delivery and legislation began to be driven by consumers during the 1980s. Activists, such as Judi Chamberlain, pressed for alternatives to psychiatrist dominated and controlled systems of mental health provision. Chamberlain's On Our Own: Patient Controlled Alternatives to the Mental Health System helped guide others intent on a more collaborative form of mental health healing.

In the 1980s with some funding from NIMH, small experimental groups flourished. In 1985 at the First Alternatives Conference attendees agreed upon the term "consumer" reflecting the patients' choice of services. The term also implied assumptions of rationality and ability to make choices in one's own best interests rather than be a passive incapacitated recipient of "expert" attention. In the 1990s many consumer groups were formed, such as Self Help Clearing House and the National Empowerment Center. They continued to press for more peer involvement in alternatives treatments, pointing out that peers support and comfort, which may be in contrast to some therapists who just attempt to change the behavior and thinking patterns.

== Contemporary usage ==
Today, the word mental health consumer has expanded in the popular usage of consumers themselves to include anyone who has received mental health services in the past, anyone who has a behavioral health diagnosis, or simply anyone who has experienced a mental or behavioral disorder. Other terms sometimes used by members of this community for empowerment through positive self-identification include "peers," "people with mental health disabilities," "psychiatric survivors," "users," individuals with "lived experience" and "ex-patients." (See the Psychiatric survivors movement for more information). The term "service users" is commonly used in the U.K. In the U.S. "consumer" is most frequently used by ex-patients and users of psychiatric and alternative services.

One can view this term, "consumer," neutrally as a person who receives psychological services, perhaps from a psychologist, a psychiatrist or a social worker. It can be impersonal term relating to the use in the health sector of a large economy. It suggests that the consumer expects to have some influence on service delivery and provides feedback to the provider. Used in its more activist sense, consumer groups aim to correct perceived problems in mental health services and to promote consultation with consumers. Consumer theory was devised to interpret the special relationship between a service provider and service user in the context of mental health. Consumer theory examines the consequences and sociological meaning of the relationship.

== See also ==
- Community mental health service
- List of mental disorders
- Mental health inequality
- Mental health professional
- Psychiatric hospital
- Right to health
- Social determinants of mental health
- Technology in mental disorder treatment
- Treatment of mental disorders
