= Epidemiology of schizophrenia =

Disability-adjusted life years (DALYs) lost from Schizophrenia in 2012 per million persons. 957-1,142 1,155-1,546 1,554-1,554 1,555-1,714 1,715-1,981 1,995-2,184 2,194-2,430 2,435-2,642 2,643-2,643 2,701-3,022

Schizophrenia affects around 0.3–0.7% of the general population at some point in life (i.e. lifetime prevalence), or 21 million people worldwide as of 2020 (about one of every 285). By using precise methods in its diagnosis and a large, representative population, schizophrenia seems to occur with relative consistency over time during the last half-century.

While it is claimed that schizophrenia occurs at similar rates worldwide, its prevalence and incidence varies across the world, within countries, and at the local and neighborhood level. It causes approximately 1% of worldwide disability-adjusted life years (DALYs). The rate of schizophrenia varies up to threefold depending on how it is defined.

== Burden of Schizophrenia ==
Schizophrenia is not only a heavy mental illness to burden, but can cause other health problems as a result. Approximately half of individuals diagnosed with schizophrenia will also be diagnosed with another mental/behavioral disorder in their lifetime. These include panic disorder, post-traumatic stress disorder (PTSD), obsessive-compulsive disorder (OCD), generalized anxiety disorder, and social anxiety disorder. These factors cause individuals lifespans to decrease about 28.5 years. This is also known as premature mortality.

== By age and gender ==
Schizophrenia is diagnosed 1.4 times more frequently in males than females, and typically appears earlier in men—the peak ages of onset schizophrenia are 20–28 years for males and 26–32 years for females. Early Onset schizophrenia in childhood, before the age of 13 can sometimes occur. A later onset can occur between the ages of 40 and 60, known as late onset, and also after 60 known as very late onset.

Generally, the mean age of first hospital admission for treatment of schizophrenia is between 25 and 35. Studies have suggested that lower income individuals tend to have their disorder diagnosed later after the onset of symptoms, relative to those of better economic standings. As a result, the lower social classes are more likely to be living with their illness untreated.

It is generally accepted that women tend to present with schizophrenia anywhere between 4–10 years after their male counterparts. However, using broad criteria for diagnosing schizophrenia shows that males have a bimodal age of onset, with peaks at 21.4 years and 39.2 years old, while females have a trimodal age of onset with peaks at 22.4, 36.6, and 61.5 years old.

This additional post-menopausal peak of late-onset schizophrenia in women calls into question the etiology of the disease and raises a debate about "subtypes" of schizophrenia, with men and women being susceptible to different types (see causes of schizophrenia). This is further supported by the variability in presentation of the disease between the genders.

Other theories that may explain this difference include protective or predisposing factors in men or women that may render them more (or less) susceptible to the disease at different points in life. For example, estrogen may be a protective factor for women, as estradiol has been found to be effective in treating schizophrenia when added to antipsychotic therapy.

== By country ==
In 2000, the World Health Organization found the prevalence and incidence of schizophrenia to be roughly similar around the world, with age-standardized prevalence per 100,000 ranging from 343 in Africa to 544 in Japan and Oceania for men and from 378 in Africa to 527 in Southeastern Europe for women.

However, the impact of schizophrenia tends to be highest in Oceania, the Middle East, and East Asia, while the nations of Australia, Japan, the United States, and most of Europe typically have low impact. Despite relative geographical proximity, the DALY rate of schizophrenia in Indonesia is nearly double that of Australia (the nations with the highest and lowest respective DALY rates). Discrepancies between DALY rates and prevalence may arise from differences in availability of medical treatment: years lived with mental disorders carry significantly higher DALY values when unmedicated than when medicated.

=== United States ===
Schizophrenia is a somewhat rare disease affecting approximately 3.2 million Americans in the United States. Also, in an average year, about 100,000 individuals will be diagnosed with schizophrenia. In 2010, there were approximately 397,200 hospitalizations for schizophrenia in the United States. About 88,600 (22.3%) were readmitted within 30 days.

== By race ==
In Western Europe it has been documented that immigrant groups are more likely to be diagnosed with schizophrenia. The immigrant groups that are predominate in the increased schizophrenia diagnosis are of black origin. The highest rates of schizophrenia diagnosis come from those of Afro-Caribbean ethnicity and those with black African descent. In the US, African Americans have been found to be three times more likely to be diagnosed with schizophrenia, and when taking socioeconomic status into account they are two times more likely than their white counterparts. However, those diagnosed with schizophrenia in developing countries have been found to have better course and outcome than their counterparts in industrialized countries. These improved outcomes may be because these countries place emphasis on harmonious interpersonal relationships.

== Prenatal care ==
In two natural experiments conducted on populations that experienced famine, the rates of schizophrenia diagnosed were observed. During both the Chinese Famine (1950s) and the Dutch Hunger Winter (1944–1945) the cohorts of the exposed group were twice as likely to develop schizophrenia as compared to the unexposed cohorts. It is possible that prenatal nutritional deficiency plays a role in the development of schizophrenia, in particular the lack of micronutrients. Countries with poor prenatal care, low food supply, or developing countries could have a higher incidence of schizophrenia, but more research is needed to confirm this hypothesis.

== Season of Birth ==
This disease has been found to be correlated with the season of birth. It's known that individuals with the disease are more likely to born in the winter months. Though the relative risk is small, persons born in the winter months are about 10% more likely to develop schizophrenia than those who are born within the summer months. Factors including the weather during these months has been found to affect the rate of this illness.

== Cannabis Use ==
Numerous studies link schizophrenia with cannabis use. Research indicates a strong correlation between the genetic predisposition for cannabis use disorder and schizophrenia, though evidence remains mixed regarding how frequently the two occur together.

== Maternal Infections and Diseases ==
Going along with the season of birth of a child diagnosed with Schizophrenia, a series of ecological studies have found when mothers are in their second trimester of pregnancy when a flu epidemic arises, a higher risk of schizophrenia among the children is present. This causing possible maternal infection and in turn increased risk of infection and diseases within the offspring. Also, maternal-fetal factors can account for this increased risk. Many factors including maternal vitamin D deficiency while being pregnant and laboring during the winter months and lower fetal body temperatures being present during the colder months fall under the maternal-fetal chronobiological dysfunction hypothesis. Other diseases and infections in mothers whom are pregnant have been linked to increased risk of schizophrenia. These include, mothers who have the herpes simplex virus, meningitis, and even celiac disease. In a Danish study, children whose mothers have celiac disease were two times more likely to develop schizophrenia later in life.

== See also ==
- Prevalence of mental disorders
- Sex differences in schizophrenia
