= Social determinants of mental health =

Societal problems that disrupt mental health

The social determinants of mental health (SDOMH) are societal problems that disrupt mental health, increase risk of mental illness among certain groups, and worsen outcomes for individuals with mental illnesses. Much like the social determinants of health (SDOH), SDOMH include the non-medical factors that play a role in the likelihood and severity of health outcomes, such as income levels, education attainment, access to housing, and social inclusion. Disparities in mental health outcomes are a result of a multitude of factors and social determinants, including fixed characteristics on an individual level – such as age, gender, race/ethnicity, and sexual orientation – and environmental factors that stem from social and economic inequalities – such as inadequate access to proper food, housing, and transportation, and exposure to pollution. Interventions can be implemented to address the social determinants of mental health, environmentally, structurally, and locally to help improve mental health outcomes and reduce the rate of mental illnesses.

== Definitions ==
Mental health describes emotional, psychological, and social well-being.

Mental health, as defined by the CDC, encompasses individuals' emotional, psychological, and social well-being, while the most common mental disorders include anxiety-disorders such as generalized anxiety disorder, social anxiety, and panic disorder; depression; and post-traumatic stress disorder (PTSD).

The concept of social determinants stems from the life course approach. It draws from theories that explain the social, economic, environmental, and physical patterns that result in health disparities and vary across different stages of life (e.g. prenatal, early years, working age, and older ages). Identifying the social and structural determinants of mental health, in addition to individual determinants, enables policy makers to promote mental health and reduce risk of illness by designing appropriate interventions and taking action beyond the health sector.

== Inequities in mental health ==
Globally, in 2019, 1 in every 8 individuals (12.5% of the population) lived with a mental disorder; however, in 2020, due to the COVID-19 pandemic, that number grew dramatically by around 27%. While mental illnesses and disorders have become more prevalent, studies have shown that mental health outcomes are worse for some populations and communities than others. Socioeconomic, racial, and gender-based inequities impact the spread of which populations are inflicted with more mental illnesses and disorders.

=== Socioeconomic Inequities ===
Several studies have shown that there is an association between the rate of mental illnesses within those who live in poverty and those who are in debt. Financial insecurity experienced by those with lower incomes tend to lead to higher rates of stress, anxiety, and depression due to a lack of job security, stable income, and strong social support systems. Furthermore, evidence compiled from several European population surveys shows that individuals facing educational and economic disadvantages are more likely to experience mental illnesses such as depression and anxiety. The opposite relationship also exists as stressors caused by mental illnesses contribute to long-term psychological distress and reduced access to resources such as education and stable employment.

=== Racial/Ethnic Inequities ===
UK-based research has consistently reported that ethnic minority groups, particularly those of Black Caribbean and Black African descent, experience higher rates of severe psychotic illnesses such as schizophrenia at higher rates than those who are White. These disparities have persisted over decades and have been observed across multiple generations.

In the U.S., African Americans may have comparable rates of mental illnesses as White Americans; however, their mental health outcomes tend to be much worse due to racial inequities such as prejudice, discrimination, how mental health is perceived within their culture, and tendencies to have an overlap with other socioeconomic inequities.

=== Gender Inequities ===
Studies have shown that women are almost twice as likely as men to have a mental illness. Women are more frequently diagnosed with depressive and anxiety disorders, while men have higher rates of substance use disorders and suicide in many regions. Some of the specific instances of gender inequities are biological differences due to different stress responses and brain structure, societal expectations regarding traditional gender roles, domestic and sexual abuse, lack of access to reproductive rights, lack of access to education, and different working conditions.

Social determinants of mental health impact men and women in different ways. Women often carry a larger share of unpaid domestic and caregiving responsibilities while being more likely to work in part-time or lower-paying occupations and face a gender-based wage gap, contributing to increased psychological stress. Women also face more internalized mental illnesses that are caused by feelings of hopelessness and despair as it manifests into anxiety and phobia-related mental illnesses. On the other hand, men are more frequently affected by externalizing mental illnesses, meaning that they are more likely to impact others, such as substance use and antisocial personality disorders. These are often associated with aggression, difficulties in interpersonal relationships, and negative impacts on physical health, employment, and family life.

== Fixed characteristics ==
Fixed characteristics refers to those that are genetic and biological and/or are not subjected to be influenced by the environment or social living conditions of an individual.

=== Gender ===
The second leading cause of global disability burden in 2020 was unipolar depression, and research showed that depression was twice as likely to be prevalent in women than in men. Gender-based mental health disparities suggest that gender is a factor that could be leading to unequal health outcomes.

Research studies included in Lancet Psychiatry Women's Mental Health Series focuses on understanding why some of these gendered disparities might exist. Kuehner in her article Why is depression more common among women than among men? mentions several risk factors that contributes to these inequities, including the role of a women's sex hormones and "blunted hypothalamic-pituitary-adrenal axis response to stress". Other factors include a woman's increased likelihood to body shaming and rumination and stressors on an interpersonal level, as well as sexual abuse during childhood. Further, the prevalence of gender inequality and discrimination in society against women may also be a contributing factor. Li et al. finds that the monthly and lifespan fluctuations of sex hormones oestradiol and progesterone in women may also influence the gender gap, especially in the context of trauma-related, stress-related, and anxiety disorders, such as through increasing vulnerability to development of these disorders and permitting the continued persistence of symptoms for these disorders.

Increased likelihood of gender-based violence for women compared to men is also another risk factor that was studied by Oram et al. Researchers found that women have a higher risk of being subjected to domestic and sexual violence, thereby increasing their prevalence to post-traumatic stress, anxiety, and depression. Also notable to consider in the context of gender-based trauma are female genital mutilation, forced and early marriage, human trafficking, and honor crimes.

While women are reported to experience higher rates of depressive and anxiety related disorders, men are more likely to die by suicide than women: in the United Kingdom, suicide is the biggest cause of death for men 45 and younger, and in the likelihood of dying by suicide, men are four times more likely in Russia and Argentina, three and a half times more likely in the United States, and three times more likely in Australia, than women, to name a few countries. Gender differences in suicide are commonly explained by pressure for gender roles and higher risk-taking behavior among men.

=== Sexual orientation ===
In studies comparing mental health outcomes between members of the lesbian, gay, bisexual, transgender, queer (questioning), intersex, asexual, aromantic and agender (LGBTQIA+) community with heterosexuals, the former showed increased risks of poor mental health. In fact, LGBTQIA+ individuals are twice as likely to have a mental disorder compared to their heterosexual counterparts, and two and a half times more likely to experience anxiety, depression, and substance misuse.

Based on the minority stress model, these mental health disparities among LGBTQIA+ people are due to discrimination and stigma. In fact, LGBTQIA+ individuals have expressed difficulty in accessing healthcare due to experienced discrimination and stigma, which as a result, causes them to not seek healthcare at all or rather delay it. Further societal isolation and feelings of rejection may also contribute to the prevalence of mental disorders among this community. In addition to the perceived and experienced stigma, LGBTQIA+ have an increased likelihood of being victims of violence. These factors, alongside others, contribute significantly to differences in mental health experiences for members of the LGBTQIA+ community in comparison to their heterosexual counterparts, thereby result in mental health inequities by sexual orientation.

=== Race/ethnicity ===
Studies conducted in the United States have indicated that minorities have similar or smaller rates of prevalence for mental health disorders as their majority counterparts. Blacks (24.6%) and Hispanics (19.6%) have lower depression rates than their White counterparts (34.7%) in the United States. While racial/ethnic minority groups may have similar prevalence rates, the consequences because of mental illness are more prolonged – which may be partly explained due to the smaller access rates for mental health treatments. In 2018, while 56.7% of the general US population who had a mental illness didn't seek treatment, 69.4% and 67.1% Black and Hispanics didn't access care. Further, in the instances of some mental illnesses, such as schizophrenia, Blacks in the United States have been reported to have higher rates compared to their White counterparts, however, research suggests that this could be due to an overdiagnosis among clinicians and underdiagnosis for other illnesses, such as mood disorders, for which Blacks had lower reported prevalence rates for major depression. These instances of misdiagnosis may be due to "lack of cultural understanding by health care providers,...language differences between patient and provider, stigma of mental illness among minority groups, and cultural presentation of symptoms. Minority groups commonly report experiences with racism and discrimination, and they consider these experiences to be stressful. In a national probability sample of minority groups and whites. African Americans and Hispanic American reported experiencing higher overall levels of global stress than did whites.

== Environmental factors ==
Social determinants of mental health include social, economic, and environmental factors

In addition to fixed characteristics, environmental factors, such as adequate access to food, housing, and health and exposure to pollution, impacts an individual's likelihood and severity of mental health outcomes. Although these factors can not directly change an individual's fixed characteristics of the social determinants of mental health, they can affect the degree to which an individual is influenced.

=== Inadequate access to proper food ===
Mental illnesses are common among those that are food insecure due to associated factors of stress and weaker community belonging. Food security refers to the state of having access to sufficient and nutritious foods in order to maintain a healthy and active life, and deviations from this can lead to food insecurity. While seen as an economic indicator, food insecurity can increase the risk to mental illnesses through stress, making individuals more vulnerable to worse mental health outcomes.

Another contributing factor that can explain this association between food insecurity and mental illnesses is social isolation. Research, for instance, shows that the majority of food insecure individuals in Canada do not have access to community food programs or food banks, suggesting that there is little to no access to social resources for these people. This factor can impact an individual's ability to feel supported or a sense of belonging within their community, thereby increasing their vulnerability to mental illnesses. The impact of food-insecurity on mental health may be worse in countries where food insecurity is less common, because it suggests a reduced standard of living and lower social standing within that country.

=== Housing ===
Studies have found a co-occurrence between homelessness and mental illnesses. The "housing first" intervention in Canada – the At Home/Chez Soi study – which aimed to provide permanent housing to individuals reported that for the study cohort, suicidal ideation diminished over time. Another study, one of the largest of its kind aimed to characterize the health of Canada's homeless youth, reported that 85% of its participants had high levels of psychological distress and 42% attempted suicide at least once.

In addition to suffering from mental illnesses, homeless individuals also have trouble accessing care: for example, 50% of homeless men in a New York City shelter reported being overtly mental ill, and nearly 20–35% of mentally ill homeless individuals were in need of psychiatric services. While homeless shelters were once viewed as transient facilities, they have been burdened to take up the role of providing care for the large number of mentally ill homeless people that occupy these shelters. However, a United Kingdom survey found that only 27.1% of homeless shelters believed that their mental health services were adequate to meet the needs of the homeless youth population surveyed in the study.

=== Violence ===
Community-level violence has been linked to poorer mental health outcomes. For example, a 2025 study found that a one-unit increase in local homicide rates was followed by a 3.6% rise in suicide rates the next year, suggesting that community-level violence may contribute to suicide risk. Such findings indicate that exposure to violence within the local environment may act as a chronic stressor, exacerbating existing mental health vulnerabilities.

=== Pollution ===
Despite the vast literature on the effect of air pollution on physical health outcomes, research on the mental health effects of air pollution are limited. Data from the China Family Panel Studies found a positive relationship between air pollution and mental illnesses, where an 18.04 μg/m3 increase in average PM_{2.5} has a 6.67% increase in the probability of having a score corresponding with a severe mental illness, approximating a cost of US$22.88 billion in health expenditures associated with mental illness and treatment.

New evidence, although still non-conclusive, suggests the association between various mental health disorders and major environmental pollutants, including air pollutants, heavy metals, and environmental catastrophes, and have found that these pathogens have a direct and indirect role on the brain and in the generation of stress levels. For instance, noise pollution could affect wellbeing and quality of life as a result of disturbances in circadian rhythms, noise annoyance, and noise sensitivity.

=== Climate ===
In addition to the role of pathogen and pollutant exposure on mental health, adverse environmental and climate changes can lead to climate-related migration and displacement that burdens and causes a mental health toll on impacted individuals. From the disruption of social ties and support systems in their native communities to the financial and emotional stress (often due to the stigma that make it hard for climate migrants to integrate) that arises due to relocating, climate migrants experience negative mental health outcomes. Forced migrants, compared to host populations, experience more common mental health disorders, including post-traumatic stress disorder, anxiety, major depression, psychosis, and suicidality due to the stressors that they experience.

Changes in climate can also impact food security in regions, food prices, and household livelihoods, thereby impacting the mental health of residents. In an Australian sample, drought was reported to affect food availability, resulting in individuals skipping meals; individuals consuming below-average food levels expressed higher levels of distress compared to those eating at above-average levels.

== Social factors ==
The social factors of the determinants of mental health looks at the role of social influences, such as discrimination and stigma, that increase the likelihood of mental health disorders among certain minority communities.

=== Discrimination ===
Extensive literature has pointed to the strong association of discrimination on mental health and worse psychological wellbeing of individuals – with some studies even suggesting that the role of discrimination on mental health is greater than on physical health outcomes. In the scope of 'physical health', studies have found that discrimination in health care delivery affects standard of care for ethnic minority communities: for example, African Americans and Latinos are less likely than their white counterparts to receive sufficient pain medication for long bone fracture or kidney stones.

Focusing on mental health specifically though, community and laboratory studies have found that discrimination, such as racial/ethnic discrimination, is associated with worse mental health outcomes through increased depression, anxiety, and psychological distress. Occupational discrimination – discrimination in work organizations – also points to this same trend, in which regardless of race, those who acknowledge being discriminated against had worse poorer mental health outcomes. The literature suggests that discrimination, despite the type, is harmful for mental health.

Researchers have also studied the role of multiple types of discrimination on mental health risk and have pointed to two risk models– first, the risk model in which groups that experience discrimination have an increased risk for worse mental health and second, the resilience model, in which these groups become more resilient to various other forms of discrimination. An extensive literature review on existing studies found that generally the findings aligned with the risk model, as opposed to the resilience model. Specifically, there were a higher risk for symptoms of depression among groups that experienced various forms of discrimination – including racism, heterosexism. The role of multiple forms of discrimination on other mental health problems, such as anxiety, posttraumatic stress disorder, substance use, are less, and the results are mixed.

Discrimination also exists in mental health care delivery among marginalized communities. Provider discrimination can affect mental health treatment among racial minorities, for example: in the United States, minority groups have similar or lower prevalence rates of mental disorders when compared to their white counterparts, however Blacks were only half as likely as whites to receive treatment for diseases of similar severity.

=== Stigma ===
Studies have found that the stigma associated with mental health problems can impact care seeking and participation. Reasons that decrease the likelihood of care seeking include prejudice against people with mental health illnesses as well as just the expectation of prejudice and discrimination for those who seek treatment. Further, lack of knowledge of mental illnesses and how to access treatment can also impact care seeking behaviors; the associated stigma surrounding mental health issues can contribute to this knowledge gap. Corrigan et al. 2014 outlines three levels of stigma – public stigma that results from label avoidance, self-stigma that results from self-shame, and structural stigma. Given these varying structures of stigma and a person's varying interactions with them, the avoidance for care seeking and participation behaviors may vary vastly. A global review on the stigma of mental illnesses and discrimination found that "there is no known country, society, or culture where people with mental illness (diagnosed or recognized as such by the community) are considered to have the same value or be as acceptable as persons who do not have mental illness".

== Economic factors ==
Economic factors can influence the frequency and severity of mental health outcomes in people of all ages. Economic factors include proximal factors such as assets, debt, financial strain, food security, income, relative deprivation and unemployment, as well as distal factors such as economic inequality, economic recessions, macroeconomic policy and subjective financial strain. According to research, there is a complicated and bi-directional relationship between economic factors such as unemployment, food insecurity, poverty and increased prevalence of adult common mental disorders in low-income, middle-income, and high-income countries. The relationship between economic factors and mental health is relevant throughout the lifecourse.

== Biological factors ==
Biological factors can also affect the likelihood of certain mental illnesses among individuals. When considering major depression, for example, the HTR1A −1019C>G genotype was found to be significantly associated among patients in Utah, United States. Further, the functional BDNF Val66Met polymorphism has also been found to be a potential genetic risk factor for depression because it impacts the volume of the hippocampus, and stress-induced hippocampal atrophy has been associated with the origination and development of affective disorders. Extensive research and literature in the fields of neuroscience and psychology – and their intersection – aim to identify these genetic and anatomical risk factors.

== Interventions ==
Research has been conducted into examining mental health treatments and interventions that consider these social determinants of mental health and the roles they play in mental health outcomes. Interventions aimed at addressing social determinants of mental health operate at multiple levels: environmental, structural, and local.

International public health organizations emphasize that reducing socioeconomic inequalities may help mitigate mental health disparities. Policy interventions such as improving access to education, strengthen social protection systems, reduce poverty, and expand universal health coverage are all structural approaches to improving mental health outcomes.

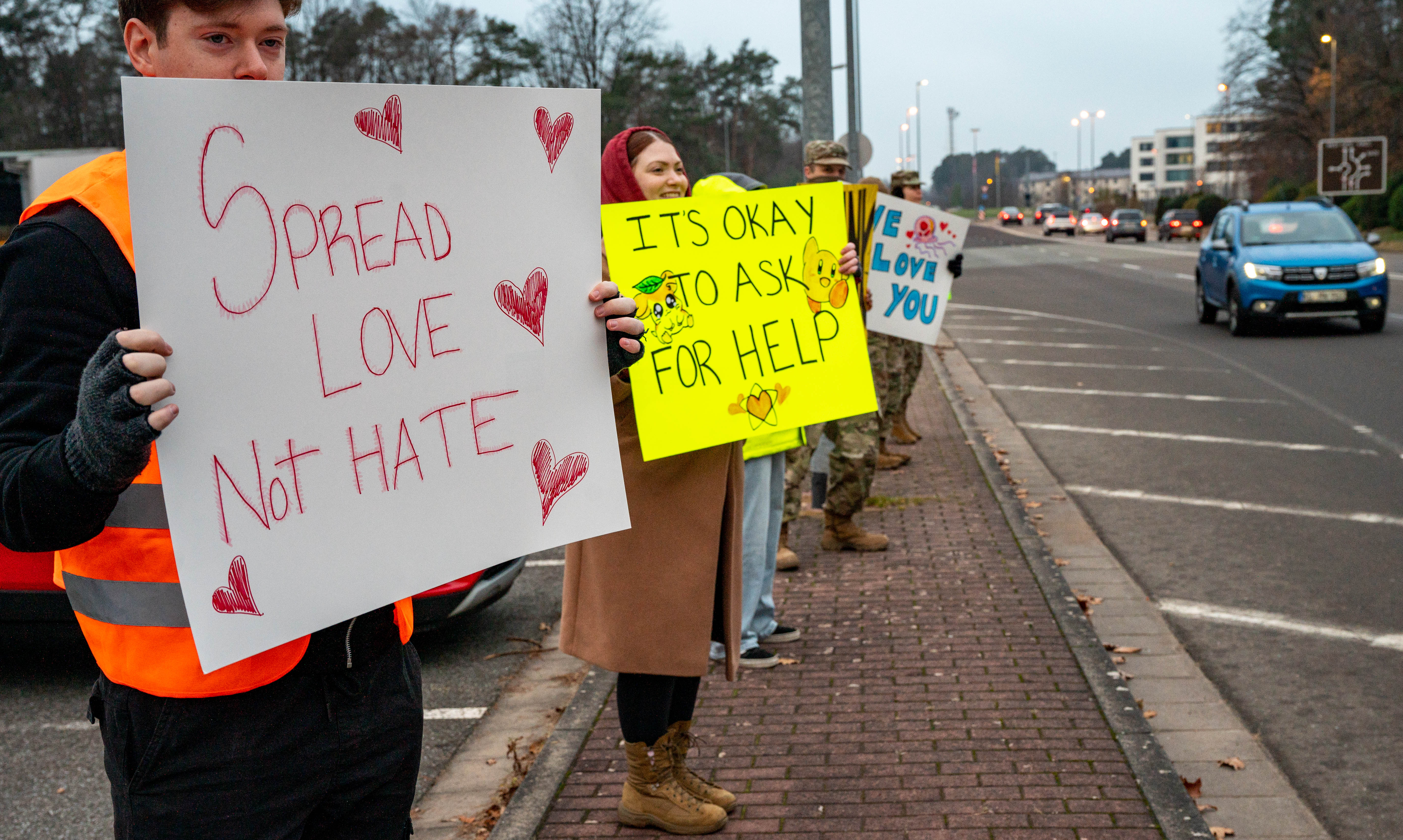

Community-based programs such as expanding mental health education in school-based initiatives and training primary and community health-care workers to address mental health disorders within the community have been developed to address barriers to care in underserved populations. These are more local-based interventions that can improve mental health outcomes and reduce the rates of mental illnesses impacting these populations.

Recommended interventions for addressing social determinants of mental health include administering an assessment of social risk factors into clinical practice, creating more community-based efforts to strengthen social support networks, and advocating for policy reforms aimed at improving access to housing, healthcare, and other social resources.

Nutritional psychiatry is an emerging area of study which aims to improve mental health of individuals through diet and food: Adan et al. 2019 highlights that intervention studies have found that diet and lifestyle could potentially influence mental health treatment and prevention.

== See also ==
- Brain health and pollution
- Causes of mental disorders
- Effects of climate change on mental health
- Mental illness in fly-in fly-out workers
- Psychological impact of climate change
- Socioeconomic status and mental health
