= Mental disorders and gender =

Gender is correlated with the prevalence of certain mental disorders

Sex is correlated with the prevalence of certain mental disorders, including depression, anxiety and somatic complaints. For example, women are more likely to be diagnosed with major depression, while men are more likely to be diagnosed with substance abuse and antisocial personality disorder. There are no marked gender differences in the diagnosis rates of disorders like schizophrenia and bipolar disorder. Men are at risk to suffer from post-traumatic stress disorder (PTSD) due to past violent experiences such as accidents, wars and witnessing death, and women are diagnosed with PTSD at higher rates due to experiences with sexual assault, rape and child sexual abuse. People who identify as transgender, nonbinary or gender queer show increased risk for depression, anxiety and post-traumatic stress disorder.

Sigmund Freud postulated that women were more prone to neurosis because they experienced aggression towards the self, which stemmed from developmental issues. Freud's postulation is supplemented by the idea that societal factors, such as gender roles, may play a major role in the development of mental illness. When considering gender and mental illness, one must look to both biology and social/cultural factors to explain areas in which men and women are more likely to develop different mental illnesses. A patriarchal society, gender roles, personal identity, social media, and exposure to other mental health risk factors have adverse effects on the psychological perceptions of both men and women.

== Gender differences in mental health ==
=== Gender-specific risk factors ===
Gender-specific risk factors increase the likelihood of getting a particular mental disorder based on one's gender. Some gender-specific risk factors that disproportionately affect women are income inequality, low social ranking, unrelenting child care, gender-based violence, and socioeconomic disadvantages. This is an especially important factor to look at because women's statistics with mental health changed as their gender roles improved from traditional to opportunistic. Women have higher levels of psychiatric morbidities when compared and are highly likely to be diagnosed with depression, while men are most likely diagnosed with alcohol dependency.

=== Anxiety ===
Women experience a higher rate of General Anxiety Disorder (GAD) than men. Women are around 15% more likely to experience comorbidities with GAD than men. Anxiety disorders in women are more likely to be comorbid with other anxiety disorders, bulimia, or depression. Women are two and a half times more likely to experience Panic Disorder (PD) than men, and are also twice as likely to develop specific phobias. Additionally, Social Anxiety Disorder (SAD) occurs among women more frequently than men.

Obsessive-compulsive Disorder (OCD) is present among both men and women at similar rates, though men tend to have an earlier onset of symptoms. Men are more likely to experience more aggressive, sexual, religious, and social impairments while women are more likely to experience fear of contamination.

Gender is not a significant factor in predicting the effectiveness of pharmacological interventions or cognitive behavioral therapy in treating GAD.

=== Depression ===
Major depressive disorder is twice as common in women compared to men. This increased rate is partially related to women's increased likelihood to experience sexual violence, poverty, and higher workloads. Depression in women is more likely to be comorbid with anxiety disorders, substance abuse disorders, and eating disorders. Men are less likely to seek treatment for or discuss their experiences with depression. Men are more likely to have depressive symptoms relating to aggression than women. Women are more likely to attempt suicide than men; however, more men die from suicide due to the different methods used. In 2019, the suicide rate in the United States was 3.7 times higher for men than women.

The presence of a gender bias results in an increased diagnosis of depression in women than men.

Diagnostic assessment can be affected when symptoms are variable, easily overlooked, or interpreted through a narrow clinical frame. In depression, some researchers have argued that this concern may be relevant to men whose distress is less likely to be reported, recognized, or captured by conventional diagnostic expectations. Shi et al. proposed that male depression may be underdiagnosed or undertreated when emotional inexpressiveness, non-help-seeking, and symptom presentations that differ from traditional expectations make depressive distress less visible.

Male-typical depressive symptoms may include externalizing or behavioral features such as irritability, aggression, substance use, and risk-taking, which may not lead to help-seeking in the same way as traditional depressive symptoms. Call and Shafer found that traditional depressive symptoms were associated with increased help-seeking, whereas male-typical symptoms were not. Researchers have proposed male-sensitive depression scales as complementary tools to help identify symptom domains such as emotional suppression, anger, substance misuse, risk-taking, and somatic complaints. However, these tools are not replacements for clinical diagnosis, and current evidence still requires further clinical, longitudinal, and cross-cultural validation.

==== Postpartum depression ====
Both men and women experience postpartum depression. Maternal postpartum depression affects around 15% of women in the United States, and around 8-10% of American fathers experience paternal postpartum depression (PPPD). Postpartum depression is under-diagnosed. Women experiencing PPD have trouble seeking treatment due to the difficulties of accessing therapy and not being able to take some psychiatric medications due to breastfeeding. Risk factors for paternal PPD include a history of depression, poverty, and hormonal changes.

=== Eating disorders ===
In the United States, women constitute 85-95% of people with anorexia nervosa and bulimia and 65% of those with a binge-eating disorder. Factors that contribute to the gender disproportionality of eating disorders are perceptions surrounding "thinness" in relation to success and sexual attractiveness and social pressures from mass media that are largely targeted towards women. Between males and females, the symptoms experienced by those with eating disorders are very similar such as a distorted body image.

Contrary to the stereotype of eating disorders' association with females, men also experience eating disorders. However, gender bias, stigma, and shame lead men to be underreported, underdiagnosed, and undertreated for eating disorders. It has been found that clinicians are not well-trained and lack sufficient resources to treat men with eating disorders. Due to these factors, research regarding eating disorders in men continues to be limited. Despite this, recent research suggests that the prevalence of eating disorders in men is increasing, the reason being a result of more men seeking help and acknowledging their struggle. Men with eating disorders are likely to experience muscle dysmorphia.

Studies have shown elevated outcomes of disordered eating in gender-diverse populations. In an analysis of 20,821 pediatric outpatient individuals, research suggested that individuals diagnosed with gender dysphoria were twice as likely to be diagnosed with an eating disorder compared to cis-gender youth counterparts. With individuals struggling with gender dysphoria, disordered eating may serve as a method of alleviating the distress associated with gender dysphoria through the modification of body features through eating pathology. Transgender and gender-diverse youth have shown increased disordered eating patterns when having experienced higher rates of discrimination and harassment.

== Gender differences in adolescence and mental health ==
Adolescents experience mental illness differently than adults, as the brains of children are still in their prime developing stages. Children also approach goals differently, which in turn can cause different reactions to stressors such as bullying.

=== Bullying ===
Status enhancement is a main driver of bullying. A bully's gender and the gender of their target can impact whether they are accepted or rejected by a gender group. A study by René Veenstra et al. reported that bullies were more likely to be rejected by peer groups who saw them as a possible threat. The study cited an example of a male elementary school bully who was rejected by his female classmates for targeting a female student, whereas a male bully who only targeted other males was accepted by females but rejected by his male classmates.

=== Eating disorders ===
The fashion industry and media have been cited as potential factors in the development of eating disorders in adolescents and pre-adolescents. Eating disorders have been found to be most common in developed countries and per scholars such as Anne Becker, the introduction of television has prompted an increase of eating disorders in media-naïve populations. Females are more likely to have an eating disorder than males and scholars have stated that this has become more common "during the latter half of the twentieth century, during a period when icons of American beauty (Miss America contestants and Playboy centerfolds) have become thinner and women's magazines have published significantly more articles on methods for weight loss". With the expansion of social media, research findings suggest an association between social media usage and engagement in disordered eating. Other potential reasons for eating disorders among adolescents and pre-adolescents can include anxiety, food avoidance emotional disorder, food refusal, selective eating, pervasive refusal, or appetite loss as a result of depression.

=== Suicide ===
Data has shown that suicide is the third leading cause of death in adolescents and that gender has an impact on the avenue an adolescent may use when attempting suicide. Males are known more to use guns in their suicide attempts, whereas females are more likely to cut their wrists or take an overdose of pills. Triggers for suicide among adolescents can include poor grades and relationship issues with significant others or family members. Research has reported that while adolescents share common risk factors such as interpersonal violence, existing mental disorders and substance abuse, gender specific risk factors for suicide attempts can include eating disorders, dating violence, and interpersonal problems for females and disruptive behavior/conduct problems, homelessness, and access to means. They also reported that females are more likely to attempt suicide than their male counterparts, whereas males are more likely to succeed in their attempts.

=== Effects of Social Media on Body Image ===
During early adolescence, one's perception of physical appearance becomes increasingly important, having a significant impact on one's self-worth. Studies have shown that social media use among adolescents is associated with poor body image. This is due to the fact that social media use increases body surveillance. This means that adolescents regularly compare themselves to the idealized bodies they see on social media causing them to develop self-deprecating attitudes. Both adolescent boys and girls are impacted by the objectifying nature of social media, however young girls are more likely to body surveil due to society's tendency to overvalue and objectify women. A study published in the Journal of Early Adolescence found that there is a significantly stronger correlation between self-objectified social media use, body surveillance, and body shame among young girls than young boys. The same studied emphasized that adolescence is an important psychological development period; therefore, opinions formed about oneself during this time can have a significant impact on self-confidence and self-worth. Consequently, low self-esteem can increase one's risk of developing an eating disorder, depression, and/or anxiety.

== Gender differences following a traumatic event ==
=== Post-traumatic stress disorder (PTSD) ===
Post-traumatic stress disorder (PTSD) is among the most common reactions in response to a traumatic event. Research has found that women have higher rates of PTSD compared to men. According to epidemiological studies, women are two to three times more likely to develop PTSD than men. The lifetime prevalence of PTSD is about 10-12% in women and 5-6% in men. Women are also four times more likely to develop chronic PTSD compared to men. There are observed differences in the types of symptoms experienced by men and women. Women are more likely to experience specific sub-clusters of symptoms, such as re-experiencing symptoms (e.g. flashbacks), hypervigilance, feeling depressed and numbness. These differences are found to be persistent across cultures. A significant risk factor or trigger of PTSD is rape. In the United States, 65% of men and 45.9% of women who are raped develop PTSD.

Epidemiological studies have found that men are more likely to have PTSD as a result of experiencing combat, war, accidents, nonsexual assaults, natural disaster, and witnessing death or injury. Meanwhile, women are more likely to have PTSD attributed to rape, sexual assault, sexual molestation, and childhood sexual abuse. However, despite the theorized explanation that gender differences were due to different rates of exposure to high impact traumas such as sexual assaults, a meta-analysis found that when excluding instances of sexual assault or abuse, women remained at a greater risk for developing PTSD. Additionally, it has been found that when looking at those who have only experienced sexual assaults, women remained approximately twice as likely as men to develop PTSD. Thus, it is likely that exposure to specific traumatic events such as sexual assault only partially accounts for the observed gender differences in PTSD.

=== Depression ===
While PTSD is perhaps the most well-known psychological response to a trauma, depression can also develop following exposure to traumatic events. Under the definition of sexual assault as pressured or forced into unwanted sexual contact, women encounter two times the rate of sexual assault as men. A history of sexual assault is related to increased rates of depression. For example, studies of survivors of childhood sexual assault found that the rates of childhood sexual assault ranged from 7-19% for women and 3-7% for men. This gender discrepancy in childhood sexual assault contributes to 35% of the gender difference in adult depression. Increased likelihood of adverse traumatic experiences in childhood also explains the observed gender difference in major depression. Studies show that women have an increased risk of experiencing traumatic events in childhood, especially childhood sexual abuse. This risk has been associated with an increased risk of developing depression.

As with PTSD, evidence of a biological difference between men and women may contribute to the observed gender difference. However, research on the biological differences of men and women who have experienced traumatic events is yet to be conclusive.

== Causes of gender disparities in mental disorders ==
=== Intimate partner violence ===
Intimate partner violence (IPV) is a particularly gendered issue. Data collected from the National Violence Against Women Survey (NVAWS) of women and men aged 18–65 found that women were significantly more likely than men to experience physical and sexual IPV. According to The National Domestic Violence Hotline, "From 1994 to 2010, about 4 in 5 victims of intimate partner violence were female." The United Nations estimates that "35 percent of women worldwide have experienced either physical and/or sexual intimate partner violence or sexual violence by a non-partner (not including sexual harassment) at some point in their lives."

There have been numerous studies conducted linking the experience of being a survivor of domestic violence to a number of mental health issues, including post-traumatic stress disorder, anxiety, depression, substance dependence, and suicidal attempts. Humphreys and Thiara (2003) assert that the body of existing research evidence shows a direct link between the experience of IPV and higher rates of self-harm, depression, and trauma symptoms. The NVAWS survey found that physical IPV was associated with an increased risk of depressive symptoms, substance dependence problems, and chronic mental illness.

A study conducted in 1995 of 171 women reporting a history of domestic violence and 175 reporting no history of domestic violence confirmed these hypotheses. The study found that the women with a history of domestic violence were 11.4 times more likely to experience dissociation, 4.7 times more likely to have anxiety, 3 times as likely to have depression, and 2.3 times more likely to have a substance abuse problem. The same study noted that several of the women interviewed stated that they only began having mental health issues when they began to experience violence in their intimate relationships.

Another study found that in a group of women in a psychiatric inpatient hospital ward, women who were survivors of domestic violence were twice as likely to have depression as those were not. All twenty of the women interviewed fit into a pattern of symptoms associated with trauma-based mental health disorders. Six of the women had attempted suicide. Moreover, the women spoke openly of a direct connection between the IPV they suffered and their resulting mental disorders.

In a similar study, 191 women who reported at least one event of IPV in their lifetime were tested for PTSD. 33% of the women tested positively were lifetime PTSD, and 11.4% tested positive for current PTSD.

As far as males are concerned, it is estimated that 1 in 9 men experience severe IPV. For men as well, domestic violence is correlated with a higher risk of depression and suicidal behavior.

=== Sexual violence ===
Global estimates published by the World Health Organization indicate that about 1 in 3 (35%) of women worldwide have experienced either physical and/or sexual intimate partner violence or non-partner sexual violence in their lifetime.

Sexual violence increasingly impact adolescent girls who are subjected to forced sex, rape and sexual assault. Approximately 15 million adolescent girls (aged 15 to 19) worldwide have experienced forced sex (forced sexual intercourse or other sexual acts) at some point in their life.

Sexual assault, rape and sexual abuse are likely to impact a women's mental health on a short and long-term basis. Many survivors are "mentally marked by this trauma and report flashbacks of their assault, and feelings of shame, isolation, shock, confusion, and guilt." Additionally, survivors of rape or sexual assault are at a higher risk for developing PTSD, with the lifetime prevalence being 50% compared to the average prevalence of 7.8%. Sexual assault is also associated with higher rates of depression, self harm, suicide, and disordered eating.

=== Social Media Pressures and Criticism ===
Social media is highly prevalent and influential among the current generation of adolescents and young adults. Approximately 90% of young adults in the United States have and use a social media platform on a regular basis. In terms of social media use and body image, boys experience social media as a higher positive influence on their body image than girls, who report social media causing more negative effects on their body image. Indeed, social media use has a connection to increased risk for eating disorders in women. Women receive greater amounts of pressure and criticism surrounding their physical appearance, making them more likely to internalize the body ideals that are glorified on social media.

Furthermore, pro-anorexia communities are widespread among social media platforms which creates an environment that encourages disordered eating behaviors, and uses primarily photos of young women to spread unhealthy messages promoting thinness. Women are more likely to be involved with pro-anorexia communities.

== Gender bias in medicine ==
The World Health Organization notes gender differentials in both the diagnosis and treatment of mental illness. Gender bias observed in diagnostic and healthcare systems (including as related to under-diagnosis, over-diagnosis, and misdiagnosis) is detrimental to the treatment and health of people of all genders.

The difference in diagnosis emerges at an early age, with diagnostic rates for children diverging on the basis of gender once children reach school age. These gendered differentials have been attributed to a variety of factors, including gendered socialization to internalize or externalize symptoms of distress, particularly in youth; clinician bias to perceive men as mentally healthy; gendered stereotypes regarding the types of disorders men and women are expected to experience, with emotional issues attributed to women and substance abuse issues to men; and stereotypes and allocation of resources based on, and reifying, these differences. Differential diagnosis rates are also related to differences in help-seeking or disclosure along gendered lines.

Diagnostic processes may be influenced by knowledge of a patient's sex or gender alone, and male and female patients may receive different diagnoses even when presenting the same symptoms. For instance, even with the same symptomology or scores according to diagnostic criteria, women are more likely to be diagnosed with depression than men.

=== Misogynistic Bias in Medicine ===
Misogynistic bias has impacted diagnosis and treatment of men and women alike throughout the history of psychiatry, and those disparities persist today.

Hysteria is one example of a medical diagnosis which bears a long history as a "feminine" disorder, whether associated with biological features or with "feminine" psychology or personality. For hundreds of years in Western Europe, hysteria was seen as an excess of emotion and a lack of self-control, that would mostly impact women. The diagnosis was used as a form of social labeling to discourage women from venturing outside of their role, that is a tool to take control over the increasing emancipation of women.

Another instance in which such disparities emerged is in the use of lobotomies, popularized in the 1940s to treat a variety of psychiatric diagnoses including insomnia, nervousness, and more. Studies have found that US asylums disproportionately lobotomized women in spite of the fact that men made up the majority of asylum patients.

==== Gender Normativity and Bias in Medicine ====
It has also been observed that mental health professionals may pathologize the behaviors of individuals who do not conform to the practitioner's gender ideals. Gender ideals have been found to influence the understanding of mental health and illness at the stages of diagnosis, treatment, and evaluation of symptomology or of treatment.

== Socioeconomic status (SES) ==
Socioeconomic Status is a global term which refers to a person's income level, education and position in society. Most social science research agrees upon the fact that there is a negative relationship between socioeconomic status and mental illness, that is lower socio-economic status is correlated with higher level of mental illness. "Researchers have found this relationship to hold constant for almost any mental illness, from rare conditions like schizophrenia to more common mental illnesses like depression."

=== Gender disparities in socioeconomic status (SES) ===
SES is a key factor in determining one's opportunities and quality of life. Inequities in wealth and quality of life for women are known to exist both locally and globally. According to a 2015 survey of the U.S. Census Bureau, in the United States, women's poverty rates are higher than men's. Indeed, "more than 1 in 7 women (nearly 18.4 million) lived in poverty in 2014."

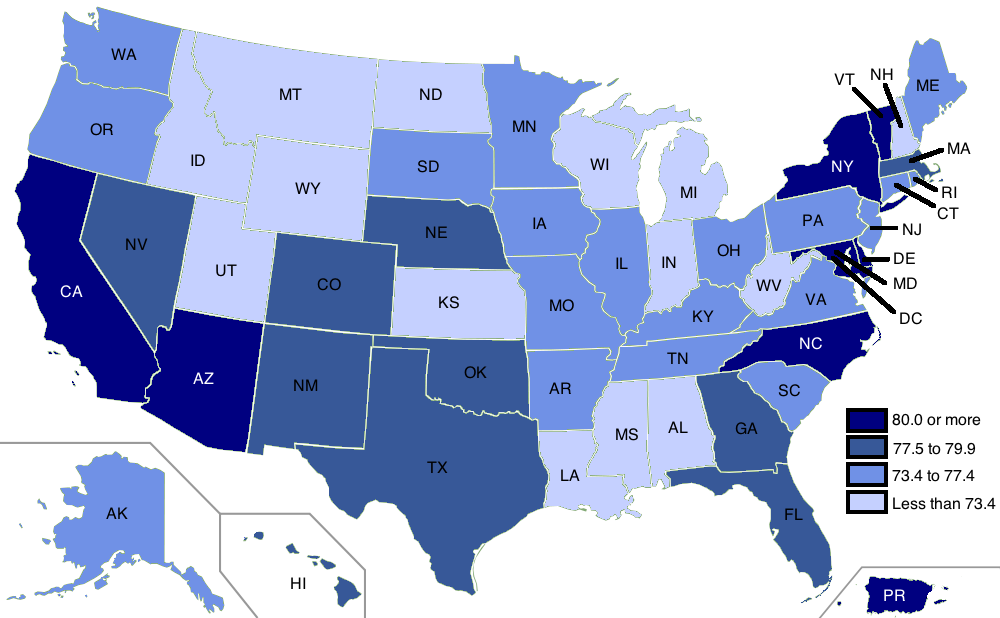
US Gender Pay Gap by state in 2006

When it comes to income and earning ability in the United States, women are once again at an economic disadvantage. Indeed, for a same level of education and an equivalent field of occupation, men earn a higher wage than women. Though the pay-gap has narrowed over time, according U.S Census Bureau Survey, it was still 21% in 2014. Additionally, pregnancy negatively affects professional and educational opportunities for women since "an unplanned pregnancies can prevent women from finishing their education or sustaining employment (Cawthorne, 2008)".

=== The impact of gender disparities in SES on women's mental health ===
Increasing evidence tend to show a positive correlation between lower SES and negative mental health outcomes for women. Firstly, "Pregnant women with low SES report significantly more depressive symptoms, which suggests that the third trimester may be more stressful for low-income women (Goyal et al., 2010)." Accordingly, postpartum depression has proven to be more prevalent among lower-income mothers.

Secondly, women are often the primary care-taker for their families. As a result, women with insecure job and housing experience higher stress and anxiety since their precarious economic situation places them and their children at higher risk of poverty and violent victimization.

Finally, a low socioeconomic status puts women at higher risk of domestic and sexual violence, therefore increasing their exposure to all the mental disorder associated with this trauma. Indeed, "statistics show that poverty increases people's vulnerabilities to sexual exploitation in the workplace, schools, and in prostitution, sex trafficking, and the drug trade and that people with the lowest socioeconomic status are at greater risk for violence"

== Biological differences ==
Research have been made on the effect of biological differences between male and female on the exposure to both Post-Traumatic Stress Disorder (PTSD) and Depression.

=== Post-traumatic stress disorder ===
Biological differences is a proposed mechanism contributing to observed gender differences in PTSD. Dysregulation of the hypothalamic-pituitary-adrenal (HPA) axis has been proposed for both men and women. The HPA helps to regulate an individual's stress response by changing the amount of stress hormones released into the body, such as cortisol. However, a meta-analysis found that women have greater dysregulation than men; women have been found to have lower circulating cortisol concentrations compared to healthy controls, where men did not have this difference in cortisol. It is also thought that gender differences in threat appraisal might contribute to observed gender differences in PTSD as well by contributing to HPA dysregulation. Women are reported to be more likely to appraise events as stressful and to report higher perceived distress in response to traumatic events compared to men, potentially leading to an increased dysregulation of the HPA in women than in men. Recent research demonstrates a potential link between female hormones and the acquisition and extinction of fear responses. Studies suggest that higher levels of progesterone in women are associated with increased glucocorticoid availability, which may enhance consolidation and recall of distressful visual memories and intrusive thoughts. One important challenge for future researchers is navigating fluctuations hormones throughout the menstrual cycle to further isolate the unique effects of estradiol and progesterone on PTSD.

=== Depression ===
Expanding on the research concerning the HPA and PTSD, one existing hypothesis is that women are more likely than men to have a dysregulated HPA in response to a traumatic event, like in PTSD. This dysregulation may occur as a result of the increased likelihood of women experiencing a traumatic event, as traumatic events have been known to contribute to HPA dysregulation. Differences in stress hormone levels can influence moods due to the negative effect of high cortisol concentrations on biochemicals that regular mood such as serotonin. Research has found that people with MDD have elevated cortisol levels in response to stress and that low serotonin levels are related to the development of depression. Thus, it is possible that a dysregulation in the HPA, when combined with the increased history of traumatic events, may contribute to the gender differences seen in depression.

== Coping mechanisms in PTSD ==
For PTSD, genders differences in coping mechanisms has been proposed as a potential explanation for observed gender differences in PTSD prevalence rates. Though PTSD is a common diagnosis associated with abuse and trauma for men and women, the "most common mental health problem for women who are trauma survivors is depression". Studies have found that women tend to respond differently to stressful situations than men. For example, men are more likely than women to react using the fight-or-flight response. Additionally, men are more likely to use problem-focused coping, which is known to decrease the risk of developing PTSD when a stressor is perceived to be within an individual's control. Women, meanwhile, are thought to use emotion-focused, defensive, and palliative coping strategies. As well, women are more likely to engage in strategies such as wishful thinking, mental disengagement, and the suppression of traumatic memories. These coping strategies have been found in research to correlate with an increased likelihood of developing PTSD. Women are more likely to blame themselves following a traumatic event than men, which has been found to increase an individual's risk of PTSD. In addition, women have been found to be more sensitive to a loss of social support following a traumatic event than men. A variety of differences in coping mechanisms and use of coping mechanisms may likely play a role in observed gender differences in PTSD.

These described differences in coping mechanisms are in line with a preliminary model of sex-specific pathways to PTSD. The model, proposed by Christiansen and Elklit, suggests that there are sex differences in the physiological stress response. In this model, variables such as dissociation, social support, and use of emotion-focused coping may be involved in the development and maintenance of PTSD in women, whereas physiological arousal, anxiety, avoidant coping, and use of problem-focused coping may be more likely to be related to the development and maintenance of PTSD in men. However, this model is only preliminary and further research is needed.

For more about gender differences in coping mechanisms, see the Coping (psychology) page.

== See also ==
- Gender bias in psychological diagnosis
- Gender differences in coping
- Gender differences in suicide
- Gender dysphoria § Classification as a disorder
- Gender in individual mental disorders
  - Sex differences in autism
  - Sex differences in schizophrenia
- Healthcare and the LGBTQ community
- Minority stress
- Mental health of LGBTQ people
- Suicide among LGBTQ people
