= Immigrant paradox in the United States =

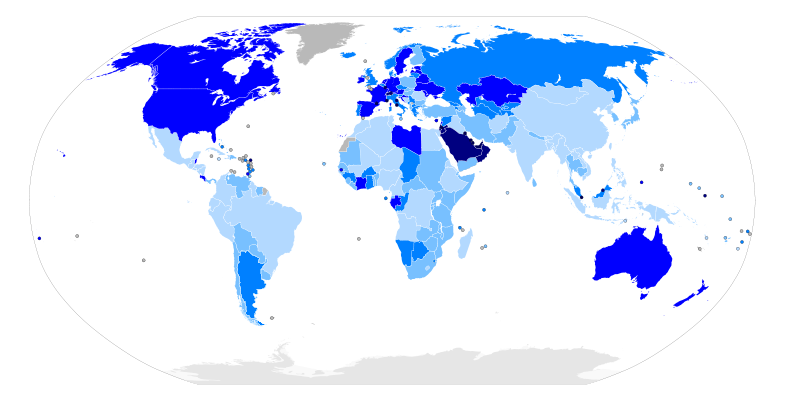
Map of the world with countries coloured according to their immigrant population as a percentage of the whole population, based on the UN's World Population Policies 2005 data. Enlarge graphic to view legend.

The immigrant paradox in the United States is an observation that recent immigrants often outperform more established immigrants and non-immigrants on a number of health-, education-, and conduct- or crime-related outcomes, despite the numerous barriers they face to successful social integration.

According to the UN, the number of first-generation immigrants worldwide is 244 million. These large-scale population changes worldwide have led many scholars, across fields, to study the acculturation and adjustment of immigrants to their new homes. Specifically, researchers have examined immigrant experiences as they pertain to educational attainment, mental and physical health, and conduct/crime.

Researchers have tried to understand why later generations seem to perform less well than their forebears. They have found that it can be explained by non-optimal methodology and differences in the way generations are modified by the host culture.

== Challenges faced by immigrants ==
Immigrants face many challenges as a result of migration, stemming from the fact that the nations and communities they settle in are culturally unfamiliar. As a result, they find themselves in an unwelcoming environment lacking in the infrastructure necessary to ensure a simple transition. Additionally, because general attitudes of the host society are often hostile and xenophobic, immigrants are doubly vulnerable. Discrimination and prejudice are common and dictate daily experiences with individuals and organizations within the host society. For example, although cultural sensitivity training is increasingly a required component of medical education, immigrants have historically faced and continue to face discrimination in the health care system. An added barrier to equitable access to health care comes as a result of many immigrants' limited English proficiency. Many health care facilities have inadequate interpretation services, and culturally sensitive health care providers are also scarce. In addition, many immigrants are uninsured, making the financial burdens of adequate health care insurmountable.

Many immigrants also settle in de facto segregated, low-income neighborhoods and ethnic enclaves, especially during periods of high immigration. Although the benefits of living in such communities include increased social support, positive in-group relations, and the virtual elimination of cultural and language barriers in daily interaction, often such neighborhoods are targets of institutional violence, such as stop and frisk. Further, due to public education funding policies in the United States, funds are often allocated to schools based on neighborhood property taxes. As a result, many immigrant children attend schools that are understaffed, underfunded, and lacking in resources in comparison to the schools of their more affluent peers. This is known as the opportunity gap, by which low-income and marginalized groups have disproportionately low access to the opportunities and conveniences afforded to societally privileged groups, resulting in group-wide disparities in academic achievement, wages, and political power. In direct relation to these obstacles, immigrants also face challenges in the workplace, including poor and dangerous working conditions, unemployment, and the employment of highly skilled individuals in low-skill jobs.

To compound all of these issues, the burden of acculturation is an added stressor. Navigating the divide between the heritage culture and the culture of the new society is difficult, as the traditions, beliefs, and norms of these two cultures are often in direct conflict. This challenge is only compounded by the other obstacles immigrants are faced with, and has deleterious consequences for mental health, particularly because many migrants and refugees are already susceptible to elevated levels of psychopathology, due to the trauma associated with interpersonal conflict, acculturative stress and/or political unrest in their countries of origin.

In light of these obstacles, it is expected that recent immigrants would have outcomes inferior to those of their native-born or non-immigrant peers.

== Paradoxical findings ==
Despite the numerous challenges facing early generation immigrants, research on the mental and physical health, educational, and conduct-related outcomes of these populations has demonstrated a paradoxical pattern.

=== Mental health outcomes ===
Research with Filipino Americans has demonstrated that first-generation immigrants had lower levels of depressive symptoms than subsequent, US-born generations. First-generation Mexican immigrants to the United States were found to have lower incidences of mood disorders and substance use than their bicultural or subsequent generation counterparts. Similarly, immigrant youth in general are less likely to engage in risky behaviours and substance use, including alcohol and marijuana consumption. Other research with Latino populations shows that immigrants are less likely to suffer from any mental disorder than non-Latino whites. Research with Asian populations has supported this apparent paradox, with first-generation Asian Americans reporting lower levels of lifetime symptoms of depression and anxiety than US-born Asian Americans. One study inclusive of immigrants to the United States from Asia, Africa, Latin America, and Europe found that immigrants, regardless of place of origin, exhibited less violent and nonviolent antisocial behaviour than US-born individuals.

These findings have been replicated outside of the United States, with Canadian researchers finding that foreign born youth are less likely to display emotional and behavioural problems than their native-born peers, despite experiencing similar levels of poverty. Research conducted in the Netherlands has also found evidence of an immigrant paradox, with first- and second-generation Muslim immigrants reporting fewer psychological problems and higher self-esteem than Dutch nationals.

=== Physical health outcomes ===
The immigrant paradox also extends to physical health, with recent immigrants having better outcomes than US-born individuals. One study of several thousand health records in Southern California found Asian and Latina women had better perinatal outcomes than both white and Black women. Specifically, Asian and Latina women had lower infant mortality, higher birth weight, fewer Caesarean sections, fewer medical diagnoses during delivery, and shorter hospitalizations. This finding has also been replicated in Spain, with immigrant mothers, barring those of Sub-Saharan African origin, having a lower frequency of low birth weight than native Spanish mothers.

With respect to overweight and obesity, it has been found that first-generation Mexican American women had healthier diets than both non-Latino whites and second-generation Mexican American women. Further, second-generation women had the poorest dietary intake, consuming even smaller amounts of necessary nutrients than non-Latina white women. US-born immigrants (i.e., second-generation immigrants, and subsequent generations) have also been found to engage in more overweight-related behaviours, such as poor diet, smoking, and little physical activity, in comparison to foreign-born immigrants. For Cubans and Puerto Ricans, increased length of stay in the United States was also associated with increased presence of overweight. These findings were replicated in a later study, which showed that with increased length of stay in the United States, immigrant health levels decreased significantly, approaching the levels of US-born individuals. Although immigrant men and women entered the US with lower BMIs than their US-born counterparts, within 10 to 15 years of arrival, there was no significant difference between the BMIs of immigrants versus US-borns. These findings apply to Asian American immigrants as well, with second- and third-generation Asian American adolescents being 100% more likely to be obese relative to their first-generation peers.

=== Educational outcomes ===
Among Latino populations, first- and second-generation Latino adolescents report high levels of effort in school, with effort declining across generations. They also place a greater value upon education, with the same downhill trend being observed. First-generation Mexican American adolescents, specifically, have more positive attitudes towards academics and skip school less than subsequent generations and non-Latino US-born Whites. They are also more involved in high school STEM coursework and have higher GPAs. With respect to Asian Americans, first-generation Asian American youth have more positive attitudes towards academics and skip school less than subsequent generations and non-Latino US-born whites. Further, first- and second-generation Asian American youth report higher levels of effort in school. Other differences in educational outcomes include superior reading achievement for first- and second-generation immigrant children, in comparison to their third-generation counterparts. First-generation Latino, Asian, and African youth have greater overall educational attainment and are less likely to drop out of high school than subsequent generations of each community. There are also differences in susceptibility to stereotype threat across generations, with second-generation Afro-Caribbean youth more at risk than first-generation youth.

=== Conduct-related outcomes ===
There is also evidence that the immigrant paradox extends to differential outcomes in conduct and/or crime. For example, rates of intimate partner violence are lower among non-Latino first-generation immigrant families. Immigrants are also less likely than non-immigrants to engage in many kinds of lifetime criminal and violent antisocial activity, including drunk driving, speeding, purposeful physical violence, and weapon use, with first-generation immigrants the least likely to engage in criminal behavior, followed by second-generation immigrants, then third-generation. These effects can be seen at the neighborhood level, with increases in first-generation immigrants resulting in decreases in neighborhood-wide violence over time. Further, among undocumented immigrants, drug-related crime is even less likely than it is among non-immigrants.

With respect to criminality among adolescents, first-, one-and-a-half-, and second-generation Asian American, African American, and Caribbean American adolescents are all less likely to engage in illegal or delinquent behavior than non-Latino US-born White adolescents. Immigrant neighborhood concentration was also negatively correlated with recidivism for Latino youth.

== A special case: the immigrant paradox in refugees? ==
There is a general consensus that refugees are at a particular disadvantage when it comes to successful resettlement in the host society, as the same challenges voluntary immigrants face are generally aggravated for refugees. However, some research has found evidence of a paradox, with refugees at least three times less likely to engage in substance use than non-immigrants. Other research has found refugees to Denmark to have a lower likelihood of stroke and breast cancer compared to Danish natives, but higher likelihood of lung cancer, HIV/AIDS, and tuberculosis. Notably, levels of all of these diseases among refugee populations eventually converged to the same levels as Danish natives with increased length of residency.

There may also be an immigrant paradox for the perinatal outcomes of refugees, with the majority of refugee women studied having a lower crude birth rate, infant mortality rate, maternal mortality rate, and percentage of low birth weight than women in both their host country and their country of origin.

== Conflicting evidence ==
There is some doubt among scholars as to whether or not the phenomenon actually exists, with some findings conflicting with the body of research on immigrant outcomes. For example, among Asian Americans, limited English proficiency was consistently associated with worse physical and mental health outcomes. In addition to language proficiency, age at time of immigration is also an important factor, with older first-generation Mexican American youth more likely to drop out of school than their US-born and younger, first-generation counterparts. In further support of this conclusion, data from the CPS shows that immigrating as a teenager is associated with completing less schooling than immigrating before or after adolescence. CPS data also shows that second-generation immigrants completed more schooling than both foreign-born immigrants and non-immigrant US-born individuals.

In international research on the phenomenon, Europe's SHARE data demonstrated no evidence of a paradox, with immigrants having poorer health outcomes than native Europeans. A study in Canada found that recent and non-European immigrant women were more predisposed to developing postpartum depression than non-immigrant Canadians.

Immigrants from North Africa and the Middle East, on average, have higher levels of education and are more likely to be proficient in English and to be naturalized. Their industries tend to be more similar to those of workers born in the United States than to those from other countries, with relatively higher shares of workers in management, business, science, and the arts. Yet North African and Middle Eastern immigrants are more likely to live in poverty than other immigrants from other countries. They are also more likely to obtain legal permanent residence in the United States, through humanitarian protection or the diversity visa lottery, than other immigrants.

== Explanations ==
=== Acculturation and the erosion of protective factors ===
The most common hypothesis for the immigrant paradox considers recent and first-generation immigrants' comparative access to cultural and social protective factors. Despite being confronted with the many challenges arising from immigration and acculturation, first-generation immigrants have greater social and cultural capital than subsequent generations. These include stronger social networks and highly adaptive cultural practices concerning religion, diet, substance use, and parenting style. Researchers also posit that first-generation immigrants are more likely to place high importance upon academic success due to fear of limited employment opportunities in the host society. These protective factors result in superior lifetime health, educational, financial, and conduct-related outcomes. Additionally, by having access to multiple cultural frameworks, recent immigrants are able to code-switch between frameworks or engage in downward social comparison as methods of self-protection.

In comparison, subsequent generations may not have access to such social and cultural capital, having been socialized into the norms and expectations of the host society (i.e., consuming more processed and unhealthy foods, having a smaller network of same-ethnicity peers, increased substance use). Further, intergenerational conflict is more likely between first-generation immigrants and their second-generation children due to differing cultural practices, with parents being accustomed to the norms of their culture of origin and children having been socialized into the norms of the host society. This type of conflict has been linked to poorer outcomes for children.

A third cost of acculturation is linked to immigrant children's cultural socialization. A strong sense of ethnic identity and pride in one's cultural heritage is generally understood to be protective from negative mental health outcomes. However, with increased length of stay in the host society, subsequent generations are likely to report decreasing levels of involvement in culturally important traditions and practices. With this comes decreasing strength of ethnic identity. Second-generation immigrants are also less likely to endorse meritocratic views, which is similarly correlated with decreasing strength of ethnic identity. These attributes are all associated with poorer mental health.

==== Possible benefits of ethnic enclaves ====
See: Barrio advantage

First-generation immigrants often settle in ethnic enclaves, which carry a host of advantages. Residents of these neighborhoods have access to a strong and supportive network of same-ethnicity peers and potential access to culturally sensitive healthcare providers that may allow for increased financial gain and better physical and mental health outcomes. Ethnic enclaves also eliminate the challenges associated with language barriers, with residents often sharing linguistic similarity.

=== Healthy immigrant selection ===
Another common explanation for the immigrant paradox is that the vast majority of superior outcomes among early generations of immigrants can be accounted for by a selection effect. Proponents of this hypothesis argue that only the most psychologically and physically healthy individuals migrate from their country of origin, and therefore have superior outcomes to begin with.

=== Methodological concerns ===
Much of the literature on the immigrant paradox in mental health relies on self-report data. This may be problematic in that certain populations may differentially interpret questions in ways that are meaningful and result in significant disparities between groups. Similarly, many measures view mental health solely through a Western lens, accounting only for the types of symptoms commonly expressed in Western societies. This may result in the underreporting of poor mental health among non-Western populations.

Another issue in research on immigrants is the grouping of highly diverse ethnic groups together in monolithic racial categories, namely the pan-ethnic "Asian" and "Latino" categories. Much of the research on Latinos and the immigrant paradox has been conducted with Mexican American populations, ignoring the fact that there are 32 other countries that fall under the Latin American label. Similarly, much research on Asian Americans has been conducted with East Asian populations, ignoring the differential treatment and experiences of South and Southeast Asians, and the different refugee status of individuals across Asia (examples include Lhotshampa refugees, who are of South Asian heritage, and Cambodian refugees, who are of Southeast Asian heritage). Such groupings are problematic in that they erase the large diversity in socioeconomic status, educational background, and historical trauma of each of these ethnic groups – factors which all contribute to the consequent positive or negative outcomes of immigrants.

== Future directions in immigrant research ==
Carola Suárez-Orozco, Ph.D. calls for increased research on the psychology of immigrants paying attention to differences in refugee status, documentation status, gender, and ethnic group (in lieu of using pan-ethnic groupings). Research must also consider seasonal migrants, the differential racialization of ethnic groups, and the role of English proficiency on educational and health outcomes.

== See also ==
- Acculturation
- Americanization (immigration)
- Health equity
- Hispanic paradox
- Mental health inequality
- Minority stress
- Model minority
