= Thomas S. Langner =

American sociologist (1924–2026)

Thomas S. Langner (January 1, 1924 – March 16, 2026) was an American sociologist who led the Midtown Manhattan Study, which showed the cultural and economic forces that shape mental illness.

Langner earned a BA from Harvard College and a PhD from Columbia University. He later taught at the New York University Grossman School of Medicine and Columbia University Mailman School of Public Health.

Langner helped write the book Life Stress and Mental Health.

He died on March 16, 2026, at the age of 102.
