= Socioeconomic status and mental health =

Relationship between mental health and socioeconomic factors

Many studies around the world have found a relationship between socioeconomic status and mental health. There are higher rates of mental illness in groups with lower socioeconomic status (SES), but there is no clear consensus on the exact causative factors. There are two main models that try to explain this relationship. The social causation theory, which claims that socioeconomic inequality causes stress that gives rise to mental illness, and the downward drift approach, which assumes that people predisposed to mental illness are reduced in socioeconomic status as a result of the illness. This predisposition to poorer SES can create a vulnerable environment for developing adolescents who are more likely to be negatively affected by financial instability in relation to the social causation theory. Most literature on these concepts dates back to the mid-1990s and leans heavily towards the social causation model.

== Social causation ==
The social causation theory is an older theory with more evidence and research behind it. This hypothesis states that one's socioeconomic status (SES) is the cause of weakening mental functions. As Perry writes in The Journal of Primary Prevention, "members of the lower social classes experience excess psychological stress and relatively few societal rewards, the results of which are manifested in psychological disorder". The excess stress that people with low SES experience could be inadequate health care, job insecurity, and poverty, which can bring about many other psycho-social and physical stressors like crowding, discrimination, crime, etc.

=== Research ===
The Faris and Dunham (1939), Hollingshead and Redlich (1958), and Midtown Manhattan (1962) studies are three of the most influential in the debate between social causation and downward drift. They lend important evidence to the linear correlation between mental illness and SES, more specifically that a low SES produces a mental illness. The higher rates of mental illness in lower SES are likely due to the greater stress individuals experience. Issues that are not experienced in high SES, such as lack of housing, hunger, unemployment, etc., contribute to the psychological stress levels that can lead to the onset of mental illness. Additionally, while experiencing greater stress levels, there are fewer societal rewards and resources for those at the bottom of the socioeconomic ladder. The moderate economics assets available to those just one level above the lowest socioeconomic group allows them to take preventative action or treatment for psychoses. However, the hypothesis of the social causation model is disputed by the downward drift model.

==== Faris and Dunham (1939) ====
Faris and Dunham analyzed the prevalence of mental disorders, including schizophrenia, in different areas of Chicago. The researchers plotted the homes of patients preceding their admission to hospitals. They found a remarkable increase of cases from the outskirts of the city moving inwards to the center. This reflected other rates of distributions, such as unemployment, poverty and family desertion. They also found that cases of schizophrenia were most pervasive in public housing neighborhoods as well as communities with higher numbers of immigrants. This was one of the first empirical, evidence-based studies supporting social causation theory.

==== Hollingshead and Redlich (1958) ====
Hollingshead and Redlich conducted a study in New Haven, Connecticut, that was considered a major breakthrough in this field of research. The authors identified anyone who was hospitalized or in treatment for mental illness by looking at files from clinics, hospitals, and the like. They were able to design a valid and reliable construct to relate these findings to social class using education and occupation as measures for five social class groups. Their results showed high disproportions of schizophrenia among the lowest social group. They also found that the lower people were on the scale of social class, the likelier they were to be admitted to a hospital for psychosis.

==== Midtown Manhattan Study (1962) ====
The study by Srole, Langner, Michael, Opler, and Rennie, known as the Midtown Manhattan Study, has become a quintessential study in mental health. The main focus of the research was to "uncover [the] unknown portion of mental illness which is submerged in the community and thus hidden from sociological and psychiatric investigators alike". The researchers managed to probe deep into the community to include subjects usually left out of such studies. The experimenters used both parental and personal SES to investigate the correlation between mental illness and social class. When basing their results on parental SES, approximately 33 percent of Midtown inhabitants in the lowest SES showed some signs of impairments in mental functioning while only 18 percent of the inhabitants in the highest SES showed these signs. When assessing the relationship based on personal SES, 47 percent of inhabitants in the lowest SES showed signs of weakening mental functions while only 13 percent of the highest SES demonstrated these symptoms. These findings remained the same for all ages and genders.

=== SES and child development ===
Children who are raised by parents with lower levels of education and in turn lower socioeconomic conditions are shown to be "five times more likely to have a psychiatric disorder" compared to those who have parents with higher levels of education. Low SES can not only contribute to the increased risk of developing mental health issues, but can also affect how long the disorder persists along with its intensity.

== Downward drift ==
In contrast to social causation, downward drift (also known as social selection) postulates that there is likely a genetic component that causes the onset of mental illness which may then lead to "a drift down into or fail to rise out of lower SES groups". This means that a person's SES level is a consequence rather than a cause of weakening mental functions. The downward drift theory shows promise specifically for individuals with a diagnosis of schizophrenia.

=== Research ===
==== Weich and Lewis (1998) ====
The Weich and Lewis study was conducted in the United Kingdom where researchers looked at 7,725 adults who had developed mental illnesses. They found that while low SES and unemployment may increase the length of psychiatric episodes they did not increase the likelihood of the initial psychotic break.

==== Isohanni et al. (2001) ====
In the Isohanni et al. longitudinal study in Finland, the researchers looked at patients treated in hospitals for mental disorders and who were aged between 16 and 29. The study followed the patients for 31 years and looked at how their illness affected their educational achievement. The study had a total of 80 patients and it compared patients who had been treated in the hospital for diagnoses of schizophrenia, and other psychotic or non-psychotic diagnoses, to those of the same 1966 birth cohort who had received no psychiatric treatment. They found that individuals who were hospitalized at 22 years or younger (early onset) were more likely to only complete a basic level of education and remain stagnant.

Some patients were able to complete secondary education, but none advanced to tertiary education. Those who had not been hospitalized had lower completion rates of basic education but much higher percentages of completing both secondary and tertiary education, 62% and 26%, respectively. This study suggests that mental disorders, especially schizophrenia, impede educational achievement. The inability to complete higher education may be one of the possible contributors to the downward drift in SES by individuals with mental illness.

==== Wiersma, Giel, De Jong and Slooff (1983) ====
The researchers in the Wiersma, Giel, De Jong and Slooff study looked at both educational and occupational attainment of patients with psychosis compared to their fathers. Researchers assessed both topic areas in the fathers as well as in the patients. In a two-year follow-up, the downward mobility in both education and occupation was greater than expected in the patients. Only a small percentage of patients were able to keep their job or find a new one after the onset of psychosis. Most of the individuals participating in the study had a lower SES than when they were born. This study also showed that the drift may begin with prodromal symptoms rather than at full onset.

== Debate ==
Many researchers argue against the downward drift model, because unlike its counterpart, "it does not address the psychological stress of being impoverished and fails to validate that persistent economic stress can lead to psychological disturbance". Mirowsky and Ross discuss in their book, Social Causes of Psychological Distress, that stress frequently stems from lack of control, or the feeling of lack of control, over one's life. Those in lower SES have a minimal sense of control over the events that occur in their lives.

They argue that lack of control does not only stem from jobs with low income, but that "minority status also lowers the sense of control, partly because of lower levels of education, income, and unemployment, and partly because any given level of achievement requires greater effort and provides fewer opportunities". The arguments posed in their book support social causation since such high stress levels are involved. Although both models can be existing, they do not need to be mutually exclusive, researchers tend to agree that downward drift has more relevance to someone diagnosed with schizophrenia.

According to a 2009 meta-analysis by Paul and Moser, countries with high income inequality and poor unemployment protections have worse mental health outcomes among the unemployed.

=== Implications for schizophrenia ===
Although social causation can explain some forms of mental illnesses, downward drift "has the greatest empirical support and is one of the cardinal features of schizophrenia". The downward drift theory is more applicable to schizophrenia for a number of reasons. There are varying degrees of the disease, but once a psychotic break is experienced, the person often cannot function at the same level as before. This impairment affects all areas of life—education, occupation, social and family connections, etc. Due to the many challenges, patients will likely drift to a lower SES because they are unable to keep up with previous standards.

Another reason why the downward drift theory is preferred is that, unlike other mental illnesses such as depression, once someone is diagnosed with schizophrenia they have the diagnosis for life. While symptoms may not be constant, "individuals with this diagnosis often experience cycles of remission and relapse throughout their lives".

This explains the large discrepancy between the incidence of schizophrenia and prevalence of the disease. There is a very low rate of new cases of schizophrenia in comparison to the number of total cases because "it often starts in early adult life and becomes chronic". Patients will usually function at a lower level once the illness has manifested itself. Even with the help of antipsychotic medication and psycho-social support, most patients will still experience some symptoms making moving up out of a lower SES nearly impossible.

Another possible explanation for the relationship between the downward drift theory and schizophrenia is the stigma associated with mental illness. Individuals with mental illness are often treated differently, usually negatively, by their community. Although great strides have been made, mental illness is often unfavorably stigmatized. As Livingston explains, "stigma can produce a negative spiraling effect on the life course of people with mental illnesses, which tends to create...a decline in social class".

Individuals who develop schizophrenia cannot function at the level they are used to, and "are particularly likely to experience the effects of ostracism, being amongst the most stigmatized of all the mental illnesses." The complete exclusion they experience helps to maintain their new lower status, preventing any upward mobility. The downward drift theory may be mainly applicable to schizophrenia; however, it may also apply to other mental illnesses since each is accompanied by a negative stigma.

While it can be hard to maintain status once the schizophrenia appears, some individuals are able to resist a downward drift, particularly if they start out at a higher SES. For example, if a person is from a high SES, they have the ability to access preventative resources and possible treatment for the disease which can help buffer the drift downwards and help maintain their status. It is also important for those with schizophrenia to have a strong network of friends and family because friends and family may notice signs of the illness before full onset. For example, individuals that are married show less of a drift downwards than those who are not. Individuals who do not have a support system may show early signs of psychotic symptoms that go unnoticed and untreated.

=== Socioeconomic status and depression ===
Depression is linked to low socioeconomic status. Groups with lower income and lower levels of education have higher rates of depression. According to the 2025 study by Jesperson et al. "lower occupational status was associated with higher risk of depression in 4 of 6 studies" with unemployment also being correlated with a high potential for depression development. The opposite was found when compared to those with high socioeconomic status with no reports of a strong correlation between depression and high SES.

== Global impact ==
As of 2019, 970 million people around the world have a mental disorder, accounting for "1 in 6 years lived with disability worldwide". This in turn contributes to reduced productivity and work-related disabilities that are correlated with low SES. People with low SES experience a higher rate of environmental stressors with less healthcare services being available to them. Mental illness in developing countries like Iran are most prevalent, with depression and anxiety being the most common cause of death and disability. From a study conducted in Tehran, those with the lowest wealth index were reported to have 2.54, 2.89 and 1.65 times higher prevalence of depression, anxiety and stress compared to those with the most wealth, indicating that economic inequalities can lead to higher risk of mental health disorders.

== See also ==
- Causes of mental disorders
- Causes of poverty
- Culture
- Culture of poverty
- Homelessness and mental health
- Identity performance
- Marx's theory of alienation
- Mental health inequality
- Poverty
- Occupational burnout
- Racism
- Sexism
- Social determinants of mental health
- Social rejection
- Social stigma
- Social stress
- Socioeconomic status and memory
- Unemployment
