= Mental health of LGBTQ people =

People who are LGBTQ are significantly more likely to experience depression, PTSD and generalized anxiety disorder compared to cisgender and heterosexual people.

== Risk factors and the minority stress model ==
The minority stress model takes into account significant stressors that distinctly affect the mental health of those who identify as lesbian, gay, bisexual, transgender, or another non-conforming gender identity. Some risk factors that contribute to worsening mental health are heteronormativity, discrimination, harassment, rejection (e.g., family rejection and social exclusion), stigma, prejudice, denial of civil and human rights, lack of access to mental health resources, lack of access to gender-affirming spaces (e.g., gender-appropriate facilities), and internalized homophobia. The structural circumstances in which a non-heterosexual or gender non-conforming individual is embedded significantly affect the potential sources of risk. The compounding of these everyday stressors increases poor mental health outcomes among individuals in the LGBT community. Evidence suggests that there is a direct association between LGBT individuals' development of severe mental illnesses and exposure to discrimination.

In addition, there is a lack of access to mental health resources specific to LGBTQ individuals and a lack of awareness about mental health conditions within the LGBTQ community that hinders patients from seeking help.

== Limited research ==
There is limited research regarding mental health in the LGBTQ community. Several factors affect the lack of research on mental illness within non-heterosexual and non-conforming gender identities. Some factors identified: the history of psychiatry with conflating sexual and gender identities with psychiatric symptomatology; the medical community's history of labelling gender identities, such as homosexuality as an illness (now removed from the DSM); the presence of gender dysphoria in the DSM-V; prejudice and rejection from physicians and healthcare providers; LGBT underrepresentation in research populations; physicians' reluctance to ask patients about their gender; and the presence of laws against the LGBT community in many countries. General patterns such as the prevalence of minority stress have been broadly studied.

There is also a lack of empirical research on racial and ethnic differences in mental health status among the LGBT community and the intersection of multiple minority identities.

== Stigmatization of LGBTQ individuals with mental illness ==
There is a significantly greater stigmatization of LGBT individuals experiencing more severe conditions. The presence of the stigma affects individuals' access to treatment and is particularly present for non-heterosexual and gender non-conforming individuals who have schizophrenia.

A stigma that has gradually reduced is the belief that being LGBTQ is a form of mental illness. Homosexuality is not a mental illness, but was considered one until 1973. Being transgender was considered a mental illness until 2019. The long-standing classification of LGBTQ individuals' identity as a mental illness was used to justify discrimination and violence against the community. The long-term effects of discrimination and violence have increased the likelihood of mental illness in LGBTQ individuals. Some mental illnesses that stem from these stressors are anxiety, PTSD, and depression.

== Disorders ==
=== Anxiety ===
LGBTQ individuals are nearly three times more likely to experience anxiety compared to heterosexual individuals. Gay and bisexual men are more likely to have generalized anxiety disorder (GAD) compared to heterosexual men. Minority stressors, such as homophobia and discrimination, increase the likelihood of anxiety among LGBTQ individuals. LGBTQ individuals are often apprehensive of prejudice from others; this constant alertness can cause chronic stress, which can lead to anxiety.

=== Depression ===
Individuals who identify as non-heterosexual or gender non-conforming are more likely to experience depressive episodes and suicide attempts than those who identify as heterosexual. Based solely on their gender identity and sexual orientation, LGBTQ individuals face stigma, societal bias, and rejection that increase the likelihood of depression. Gay and bisexual men are more likely to have major depression and bipolar disorder than heterosexual men.

Transgender youth are nearly four times more likely to experience depression, as compared to their non-transgender peers. Compared to LGBTQ youth with highly accepting families, LGBTQ youth with less accepting families are more than three times likely to consider and attempt suicide. As compared to individuals with a level of certainty in their gender identity and sexuality (such as LGB-identified and heterosexual students), youth who are questioning their sexuality report higher levels of depression and worse psychological responses to bullying and victimization. Transgender youth who report higher feelings of internalized transphobia are found to be more likely to meet the diagnostic criteria for depression. On the other hand, those who report their perceived physical appearance are consistent with their internal gender identity are less likely to be diagnosed with depression.

31% of LGBTQ older adults report depressive symptoms. LGBTQ older adults experience LGBTQ stigma and ageism that increase their likeliness to experience depression.

=== Post-traumatic stress disorder (PTSD) ===
LGBTQ individuals experience higher rates of trauma than the general population, the most common of which include intimate partner violence, sexual assault and hate violence. Compared to heterosexual populations, LGBTQ individuals are at 1.6 to 3.9 times greater risk of probable PTSD. One-third of PTSD disparities by sexual orientation are due to disparities in child abuse victimization.

=== Suicide ===
As compared to heterosexual men, gay and bisexual men are at a greater risk for suicide, attempting suicide, and dying of suicide. In the United States, 29% (almost one-third) of LGBT youth have attempted suicide at least once. Compared to heterosexual youth, LGBTQ youth are twice as likely to feel suicidal and over four times as likely to attempt suicide. Transgender individuals are at the greatest risk of suicide attempts. One-third of transgender individuals (both in youth and adulthood) has seriously considered suicide and one-fifth of transgender youth has attempted suicide.

LGBTQ youth are four times more likely to attempt suicide than heterosexual youth. Youth who are questioning their gender identity and/or sexuality are two times more likely to attempt suicide than heterosexual youth. Bisexual youth have higher percentages of suicidality than lesbian and gay youth. As compared to white transgender individuals, transgender individuals who are African American/black, Hispanic/Latinx, American Indian/Alaska Native, or Multiracial are at a greater risk of suicide attempts. Nearly four out of ten older adults in the LGBTQ community have reported considering suicide.

=== Substance abuse ===
In the United States, an estimated 20-30% of LGBTQ individuals abuse substances. This is higher than the 9% of the U.S. population that abuse substances. In addition, 25% of LGBTQ individuals abuse alcohol compared to the 5-10% of the general population. Lesbian and bisexual youth have a higher percentage of substance use problems as compared to sexual minority males and heterosexual females. However, as young sexual minority males mature into early adulthood, their rate of substance use increases. Lesbian and bisexual women are twice as likely to engage in heavy alcohol drinking as compared to heterosexual women. Gay and bisexual men are less likely to engage in heavy alcohol drinking as compared to heterosexual men.

Substance use such as alcohol and drug use among LGBT individuals can be a coping mechanism in response to everyday stressors like violence, discrimination, and homophobia. Substance use can threaten LGBT individuals' financial stability, employment, and relationships.

=== Eating disorders ===
The average age for developing an eating disorder is 19 years old for LGBT individuals, compared to 12–13 years old nationally. In a national survey of LGBTQ youth conducted by the National Eating Disorders Association, The Trevor Project and the Reasons Eating Disorder Center in 2018, 54% of participants indicated that they had been diagnosed with an eating disorder. An additional 21% of surveyed participants suspected that they had an eating disorder.

Various risk factors may increase the likelihood of LGBTQ individuals experiencing disordered eating, including fear of rejection, internalized negativity, post-traumatic stress disorder (PTSD) or pressure to conform with body image ideals within the LGBTQ community.

42% of men who experience disordered eating identify as gay. Gay men are also seven times more likely to report binge eating and twelve times more likely to report purging than heterosexual men. Gay and bisexual men also experience a higher prevalence of full-syndrome bulimia and all subclinical eating disorders than their heterosexual counterparts.

Research has found lesbian women to have higher rates of weight-based self-worth and proneness to contracting eating disorders compared to gay men. Lesbian women also experience comparable rates of eating disorders compared to heterosexual women, with similar rates of dieting, binge eating and purging behaviours. However, lesbian women are more likely to report positive body image compared to heterosexual females (42.1% vs 20.5%).

Transgender individuals are significantly more likely than any other LGBTQ demographic to report an eating disorder diagnosis or compensatory behaviour related to eating. Transgender individuals may use weight restriction to suppress secondary sex characteristics or to suppress or stress gendered features.

There is limited research regarding racial differences within LGBT populations as it relates to disordered eating. Conflicting studies have struggled to ascertain whether LGBTQ people of color experience similar or varying rates of eating disorder proneness or diagnosis.

== Coping mechanisms ==
Each individual has their own coping mechanisms for difficult emotions and situations. Frequently, the coping mechanism adopted by a person, depending on whether it is adaptive or maladaptive, will impact their mental health. These coping mechanisms tend to be developed during youth and early-adult life. Once a maladaptive coping mechanism is adopted, it is often hard for the individual to address.

Adaptive coping mechanisms, pertaining to mental disorders, involve communication with others, body and mental healthcare, support, and care-seeking.

The LGBTQ community may experience stigmatization in school, public spaces, and society. As a result, the young people among them are less likely to express themselves and less likely to seek care and support. This is due to the lack of resources and safe spaces available for them to do so. As a result, most adult LGBTQ individuals adopt some form of maladaptive coping mechanisms.

Maladaptive coping mechanisms include: self-harm, substance abuse, or risky sexual behavior. LGBTQ youth between the ages of 13 and 17 reported self-harming for intrapersonal reasons rather than interpersonal ones. Some of the reasons for self-harming included: to cope with uncomfortable feelings, to deal with frustration, to relieve stress or pressure, as a form of self-punishment, or to make their emotional pain into something physical. Transgender men reported the highest rates of past-year self-harm, followed by nonbinary people assigned female at birth, transgender women, nonbinary people assigned male at birth, then cisgender women. These mechanisms are used to feel a sense of control and safety. Once adopted, these coping mechanisms can persist and therefore endanger the individual's future mental health, as well as relationships with others and oneself.

== See also ==
- LGBTQ health
- Mental health inequality
- Suicide among LGBTQ people
