= Mental health inequality =

Unequal distribution of mental health care quality

Mental health inequality refers to the unequal distribution of mental health care quality, accessibility, and outcomes among social, economic, and demographic groups. Globally, the World Health Organization estimates that 350 million people are affected with depressive disorders. Mental health can be defined as an individual's well-being and/or the absence of clinically defined mental illness. Inequalities that can occur in mental healthcare may include mental health status, access to and quality of care, and mental health outcomes, which may differ across populations of different race, ethnicity, sexual orientation, sex, gender, socioeconomic statuses, education level, and geographic location. Social determinants of health, more specifically the social determinants of mental health, that can influence an individual's susceptibility to developing mental disorders and illnesses include, but are not limited to, economic status, education level, demographics, geographic location and genetics. Mental health inequalities can be addressed through changes in healthcare policies, culturally responsive mental health interventions, adjunctive therapeutic interventions, and telemedicine.

== Disparities in accessing and quality of mental health care ==
African Americans are less likely to have access to mental health care and are more likely to have lesser quality care when they do find it. African Americans and other members of racial minorities are more likely to be uninsured or have Medicaid, limiting the amount and type of access that they have mental health outpatient sources. In one study, of all those who received mental health care, minority populations reported a higher degree of unmet needs and dissatisfaction with the services they were given (12.5% of whites, 25.4% of African Americans, and 22.6% of Hispanics reported poor care). Therefore, due to differing insurance discrepancies and costs, there is an increased likelihood of minority groups utilizing different sources of care. More specifically, African Americans are more likely to use emergency services or alternative treatments instead of going to a specialized physician for mental health issues.

In addition, mental illnesses are often under- and over-diagnosed among different minority groups for various reasons. In fact, in the 12 months leading up to 2010, the prevalence of psychiatric disorders were 15% in African Americans and 16% for Hispanics, but 21% of non-Hispanic whites . Despite this, African Americans and Hispanics are more likely to be diagnosed with an affective disorder than white individuals. For example, schizophrenia is often over-diagnosed in African Americans, whereas mood disorders, depression, and anxiety are under-diagnosed.

The LGBTQ+ population, while still open to the same disparities as racial minority groups, is often confronted with the problem of being denied mental health treatment because of the gender they identify as or their sexual orientation. In a study conducted by The National Center for Transgender Equality and the National Gay and Lesbian Task Force, 19% of the LGBTQ+ sample reported being denied the healthcare they needed. In addition, 28% of the sample reported being harassed or even physically assaulted during the health visit. While denial of treatment and harassment during treatment are large causes of the disparities among mental health care quality, the lack of knowledge is also of concern among the LGBTQ+ population. As it is such a newly developing field of study, there is very little knowledge or research conducted that relate specifically to LGBTQ+ health and healthcare. In 2012, about 50% of transgender people surveyed reported having to teach aspects of their health and treatment to the health care providers.

=== Socioeconomic status disparities ===
Lack of socioeconomic resources can lead to development of traumatic experiences that precipitate into mental health disorders. For example, not having employment or having limited access to resources can influence the course of developing some of the most common mental health disorders, such as depression, anxiety, bipolar disorder, and psychological stress. Living with a mental health disorder can also contribute to disparities in receiving mental health care. Living with a mental health disorder could affect an individual's economic status, which can additionally lead into their mental health quality as well as life expectancy.

When looking at socioeconomic statuses, it is important to look into the discrepancies that homeless individuals face pertaining to mental health. Most, if not all, homeless individuals live in poverty, which as stated before, causes them to have less access to proper mental healthcare or health insurance. At least one-third of homeless individuals report one or more psychiatric illness, which is mostly due to the abuse of drugs or alcohol. Furthermore, the stress from previous mental health problems and economic instability, tend to become worse once an individual becomes homeless. This results in other mental health problems arising such as schizophrenia, suicidal ideation, paranoia, and psychosis. Due to homeless individuals not having any economic independence, they tend to lack adequate care from mental health specialists and this causes them to be put in unsafe conditions or situations.

Another socioeconomic factor that can lead to barriers and inequalities in accessing mental health care services include financial restraints. There has been a rise in cost for uninsured individuals in accessing mental health care services compared to individuals who have private or public insurance.

Socioeconomic status disparities were especially prevalent worldwide during the 2020 COVID-19 pandemic. A study conducted over the first two years of the pandemic in Japan found that lower-income individuals were more heavily impacted by the shifts in the socioeconomic conditions and social capital resources during the pandemic, leading to higher levels of mental distress among the population. For example, a reduction in in-person communication was associated with a decline in mental health only among lower-income groups. During the second year of the pandemic, economic instability had a stronger correlation with declining mental health with lower-income cohorts.

Food insecurity associated with lower socioeconomic statuses is also correlated with more severe levels of mental illness. A study conducted in Guatemala found that populations who are moderately food insecure were 7.4 times more likely to experience signs of depression than individuals who were food secure, and people who were extremely food insecure were 11.9 times more likely to show the same symptoms. While food insecurity was linked to many physical health conditions that contributed to mental health outcomes, it was also linked to psychosocial stressors due to the uncertainty and pressure of acquiring adequate food quantity and quality. This stress unequally impacted women due to public stigma stemming from not being able to provide sufficient food for their families.

Stigma of mental health and care in rural communities

Mental health care tends to be more stigmatized in rural communities because many residents do not recognize mental illness nor accept a diagnosis of mental illness. In rural American communities, the issue of mental health is not seen to be as prevalent or at all existing as it is in more urban areas with many brushing off mental health symptoms and having difficulty in recognizing when one needs to seek help. Specific characteristics of rural communities can make it more difficult to understand mental health or seek out care. Many living in rural areas do not have the same education on mental illness as others in urban areas do, especially in schools. This lack of understanding leads to judgment and disbelief, which in turn leads individuals to not seek care for any emotional issues they may be experiencing. Most rural areas are characterized by being tight-knit and self-reliant, which leads many to distrust care providers and their diagnosis. Residing in a tight-knit community comes with disadvantages such as a lack of privacy. Rural parents are hesitant to get their child mental health care for fear of stigma by association. What stops many parents from seeking help for their child is the fear of isolation from friends and community members if their child were to be diagnosed. The adults of these communities can and do also experience fear of stigma for their own possible mental health diagnosis. Both men and women can experience mental illness in rural communities. Men tend to brush off mental health with the concern that they will appear less of a man if they seek out help. Females experience higher rates of depression and public and self-stigma leading them to avoid seeking care just as much as men. Many parents reported fear of judgment from community members. It was also reported from surveys that many feel mental health can start to lose its stigma in rural areas if more effort and time are put into creating mental health programs in schools and the fostering of a more positive and educated community.

=== Education disparities ===
Educational disparities can be defined as unjust or unfair differences in educational outcomes that can be a result of difference in treatment of certain minority groups in schools, varying socioeconomic statuses, and varying educational needs. These disparities in education can ultimately lead to issues of mental health. When this happens, individuals from disadvantaged socioeconomic backgrounds get looped into the cascading effects of inequality.

Disparities in education, contributory to socioeconomic status, immigrant status, and ethnic/racial status can be another contributing factor to mental health inequality. Socioeconomic status plays a large role in the difference in access to educational resources. School districts are split geographically. Because the current funding for public schools comes from local property taxes, there is more incentive for high-status individuals to narrow the boundaries to not include lower income families from their school districts. Because each school district is then only encompassing one socioeconomic group, the programs and quality are affected. This is where we begin to see the dramatic differences between school districts. While some schools offer amazing guidance departments, advanced classes, and phenomenal facilities, other areas struggle to find qualified and motivated teachers to teach basic classes. Although public education is something that is supposed to be a right for all, an individual's socioeconomic status can greatly affect the quality of that education.

An individual's immigration status also affects the quality of education received. While there are some immigrant groups which do well after immigrating to the United States, many do not have the same level of success. There are many barriers that prevent the academic success of immigrant children. These barriers include but are not limited to the fact that most parents of immigrant children do not understand the United States educational system, inadequate English as a Second Language programs, and segregation. There are also differences in outcomes across immigrant generation, with first-generation immigrants performing better than subsequent generations. This is termed the immigrant paradox. These issues along with the psychological effects of acculturation (e.g., adapting to a whole new country, language, and culture) amplify educational inequality.

Disparities in education are the insufficiency of resources that are included but limited. These disparities usually targets socially excluded communities with low income. Statistics are used when measuring grades, GPA, test scores, and dropout rates to determine the success of students. By creating a system in which a person could never succeed can perpetuate inequalities, especially those suffering from mental health.

In Rural areas, the mental health crisis is especially exacerbated because of the lack of education pertaining to mental health and how to deal with it. Because of this lack of education, mental health is stigmatized, and it is seen as a shame to have any and all problems with mental health. This causes people to not share mental health problems, and to keep them to themselves.

=== Spatial disparities (geographic location) ===
Spatial disparities include, but are not limited to, where one lives, spends most of their time, where they receive most of their resources, and where they receive education. For example, minority races who live in higher poverty neighborhoods are at higher risk for additional stresses and mental health disorders. Yet this population has been shown to experience more difficulties in accessing mental health services. Considering this cycle of needing care but not being able to receive care, inequality due to spatial location will likely remain and continue to limit access to mental health care without additional intervention to increase access to mental health services.

Many minorities including African Americans, Hispanics, and Asian Americans inhabit these poverty filled neighborhoods due to factors being not in their favor in certain aspects of society. These neighborhoods lack resources such as offices with psychiatrists or health clinics with good doctors who are trained to help those in need of mental health care. It would also be beneficial to make specific services just for those in high-poverty neighborhoods who lack the resources so we can encourage those in need to get the help that they deserve. With adjustments made to meet these circumstances, the spatial disparities can be lowered and allow those who need the help to get it.

How does geographic location affect the quality/number of treatment or qualified providers

Mental health disorders can affect anyone, no matter the geographic location or quality of life. Rural communities report mental health as one of their main health problems that needs to be addressed. The lack of licensed psychologists and social workers only adds to the list of problems. Many rural communities find it challenging to receive psychiatric care when specialized providers may be hundreds of miles away, making it difficult to seek out mental health care. Families and individuals in rural community's report making less money than their counterparts in urban areas. This disparity makes it harder to access quality mental health care and leaves many feeling hopeless. Few hospitals in rural counties offer psychiatric services, and mental health organizations are scarce compared to those in urban counties, which are bountiful with these resources. 65% of nonmetropolitan areas do not have licensed psychologists. In counties where mental health stigma is already present, it is important to expand the resources available to individuals. While many will use their primary care doctor to help diagnose mental issues, many practitioners are undereducated on diagnosis and are hesitant to diagnose their patients due to fear of stigma, meaning they will not provide an adequate treatment plan. What causes this gap in adequate mental health providers according to research is that rural practitioners do not receive a solid education in treating mental health, and many who leave town to study psychiatry do not bring their practices back home. Research suggests that state governments successfully develop programs with financial incentives for mental health providers to return to their hometowns and provide care. Geographic location can also be important because areas with mountains, rivers, or drastic separation from civilization can cause a disparity in the quality of healthcare provided.

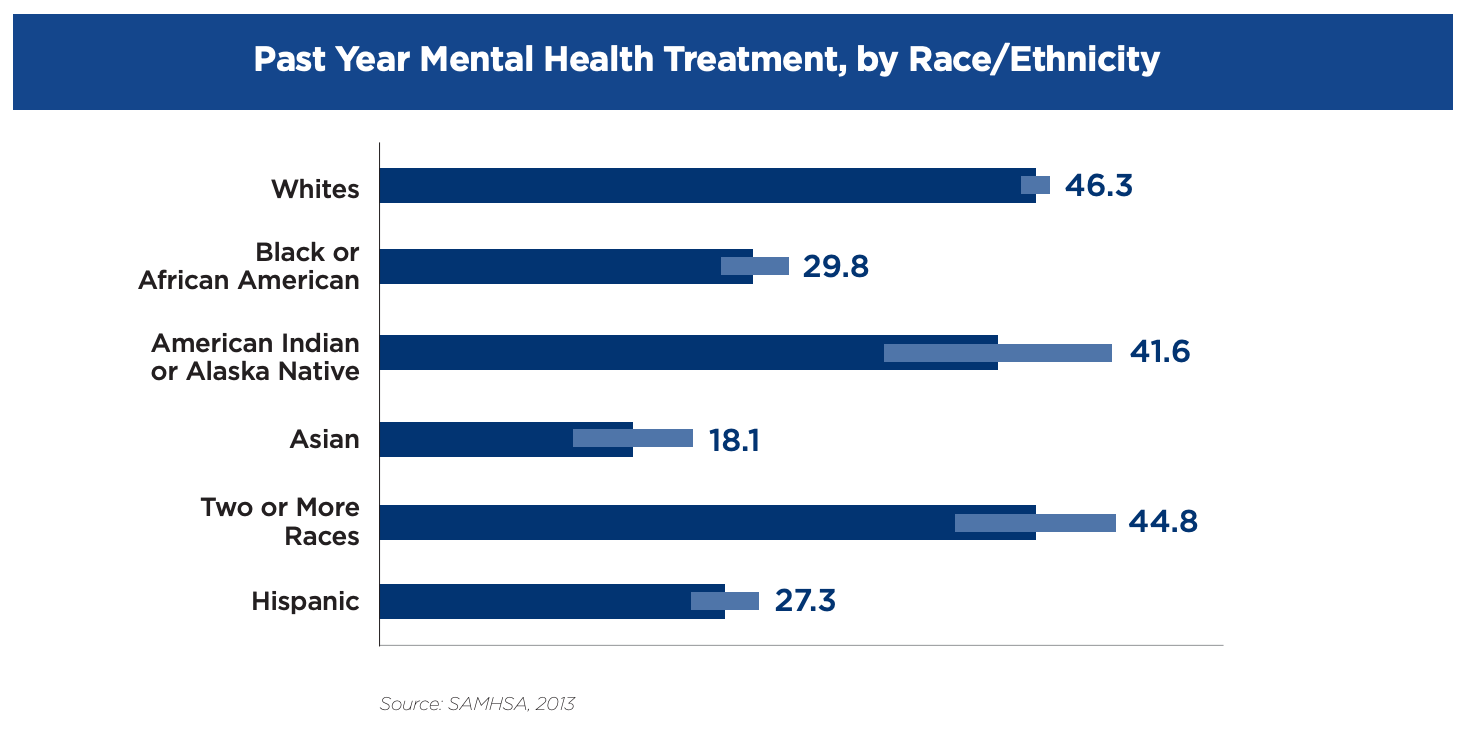
Rates of mental health treatment vary by race and ethnicity in the United States, reflecting disparities in access and utilization.

=== Ethnic and racial disparities and predictors ===
There is inequality in mental health care access for different races and ethnicities. In fact, compared to white populations, minority groups tend to have lower rates of access to quality care, but still have a greater amount of disabilities that pertain to mental health. Furthermore, studies have shown that minorities with low-income have less access to mental health care than low-income non-Latino whites. In addition to lack of access, minorities in the United States were more likely to receive poorer quality in mental health care and treatment compared to non-Latino white individuals, leading to many minorities delaying or failing treatment. Studies have shown the African Americans have decrease access to mental health services and mental health care compared non-Latino white Americans. Many minorities have difficulty in finding care for mental health services.

The historical events that took place in the United States against African Americans have resulted in a distrust in the healthcare system. The stigma of mental healthcare in the African American community has caused an increased prevalence of these disorders as surveys have found that 12 million women and 7 million men suffer from some kind of mental health illness. Besides being the most vulnerable race to contract the COVID-19 virus, they also presented a higher incidence of mental health disorders. Research has shown that this community reacts better to treatment when it is offered by healthcare professionals as an alternative to other treatments.

When considering why African Americans are so at-risk for mental health issues, it is important to consider how their race impacts their daily lives. Black individuals in this country still face discrimination, and this discrimination has a more negative impact on mental health than physical health because it leads to feelings of social isolation and negative emotions. Not only are they made to feel as though they are not fully a part of our society, but they may also feel as though their non-black family members and friends do not fully understand their struggles. This could definitely lead to subjective social isolation, or a lack of feeling close to other people. One study revealed that subjective social isolation in African Americans is correlated to having any 12-month disorder listed in the DSM and to having a higher number of 12-month disorders listed in the DSM.

Based on this reasoning, subjective social isolation could be one of the reasons why African Americans are an at-risk group when it comes to mental health struggles, and it would definitely make sense for this subjective social isolation to be a result of racism that still exists today. It is also important to consider the intersectionality of race and gender when thinking about mental health. The same study as mentioned above states that African American men are more likely to experience social isolation than African American women, which could make black men in this country even more at-risk for psychiatric disorders. When thinking about the racism in this country, this somewhat makes sense, because black men experience certain aspects of discrimination that are specific to their group. For example, African American men are often perceived as dangerous and have high rates of being arrested. When all of these risk factors are then combined with the stigma that all men face in terms of discussing mental health issues, this puts African American men at a very high risk for both developing psychiatric disorders and not feeling empowered enough to talk about their struggles.

When we are talking about racial disparities in mental health, not only do we need to acknowledge the lack of access that minority groups have to the proper health care, but we also need to understand that being in a minority racial group puts individuals at a higher risk for developing psychiatric disorders in the first place. Then, it is crucial to consider some of the possible reasons for this and begin to ask how we could decrease the disparities in this country. All minority groups are especially at-risk for mental health issues, including racial minority groups, and this is linked to systemic racism.

During the early 2010s the Latino community experienced an increase in cases of mental health disorders. Studies have shown that Latinos are more likely to present early symptoms of mental health disorders than non Latino-whites. Among Latinos, those without a legal status in the United States suffer a higher burden of being diagnose with a mental health disorders as their journey to the country has caused them to experience traumatizing events including sexual abuse, kidnapping, and the constant fear of deportation. Consequently, undocumented Latinos have a lower access to mental healthcare than U.S.-born Latinos because of the current political restrictions against this community.

After surveying individuals of different races, a study has shown that African Americans, Hispanics, and Asian Americans gain less access to the same type of mental services that non-minority whites get access to. A possible reason that the author stated:

"This theory postulates that Whites have a greater propensity to avoid living in poverty communities because they are more likely to enjoy social and economic advantages. Only seriously mentally ill Whites suffer from steep downward mobility and come to reside in high-poverty neighborhoods".

Minorities have an absence of mental health support within their communities as a result of stigmas and stereotypes applied to those pursuing mental health guidance. Another barrier to the shortage of mental health support is the lack of this type of healthcare available because of the rural settings that contain a high population of minorities. External environmental factors, such as family, community, and work, can influence the inclination to reach out for mental health counseling.This has been a problem for minority races that need the same services. It is an issue because African Americans, Hispanics, and Asian Americans need the services more in certain areas due to how biologically certain minority races are more likely to be diagnosed with a mental illness than whites.

Problems can extend to the point of racial beliefs of health professionals and researchers influencing the diagnoses and treatments developed for some communities. James Burgess Waldram wrote a 2004 text Revenge of the Windigo (the title referring to "Wendigo psychosis", which he asserts is an artificial construction of anthropologists and psychologists) discussing the behavioral health industry's difficulties successfully analyzing and treating the needs of indigenous people in the United States and Canada.

Race is often difficult to acknowledge in mental health. Even when access to mental health therapies exists for minorities, oftentimes both the therapist and the patient can be reluctant to factor their own racial positioning into treatment or find it difficult to believe that some of their mental health stress is due to race. For example, many psychiatrists and mental health specialist fail to realize that minority races who are discriminated against face "higher rates of PTSD, major depressive disorder, and generalized anxiety disorder" than those who receive little to no discrimination. Both often favor explanations rooted in past experiences like family life, personal setbacks, and other potential barriers.

=== Migrant disparities and predictors ===
Mental health disparities are not just prevalent among racial groups but also among migrants. A cross-sectional study conducted in Shanghai observed that permanent migrants in the city were 7.1% more likely to experience depression and 7.8% more likely to experience problematic anger compared to non-migrants. Temporary migrants were 7.3% more likely to experience anxiety and 11.3% more likely to show signs of loneliness in comparison to non-migrants.

These disparities disproportionately affect migrant populations. The process of immigration, including the pressures of acculturation, disrupts all facets of life, especially economic stability and family relations. Migrants are more likely to work in low-safety and low-wage environments, most of which do not have insurance plans, prolonging denied access to care and exacerbating financial issues. Additionally, migration interrupts social and community ties through acculturation, as immigrants are adjusting to the relocation to a new environment, increasing the risk of social isolation and exclusion. Language barriers, cultural differences, and unfamiliarity with new surroundings are all contributors to increased rates of anxiety, depression, and other mental health disorders within immigrant communities.

The presence of acculturation and heightened discrimination within immigrant communities fuels stigma and marginalization, actively contributing to the wide disparities seen within the healthcare system, ultimately stressing the importance of culturally competent healthcare. Without culturally competent healthcare, immigrant communities face more barriers to treatment, ultimately worsening their mental health.

=== LGBTQ+ disparities and predictors ===
Sexuality plays a large role in the prediction of mental illnesses and overall mental health. Those who identify as lesbian, gay, bisexual, transgender, and/or queer have a higher risk of having mental health issues, most likely as a result of the continued discrimination and victimization they receive at the hands of others. In fact, a 2017 study found that states who had same-sex marriage laws that were supportive, had lower rates of suicide among adolescents that states that had unsupportive laws.

Members of this population are confronted with derogatory and hateful comments, whether through face-to-face communication or through social media, which affects their self-worth and confidence, leading to anxiety, depression, thoughts of suicide, suicide attempts, and suicide. These mental health effects are most commonly seen among adolescents, however, they are also prevalent among adults of all ages. When COVID-19 hit the US, many people used social media to communicate. Although it was good for the majority of the population to still find connection, LGBTQ+ youth and emerging adults were beginning to experience higher rates of mental health issues due to social disconnection and cyber-bullying. The sources of discrimination and victimization that the LGBTQ+ population suffers from can be both external and internal. While parts of society today are not accepting of the LGBTQ+ community and make public statements to advertise their discontent, an identifying LGBTQ+ can also have low confidence and a lack of self-worth that furthers these negative mental health effects.

The most notable predictor of mental health illnesses among the LGBTQ population is family acceptance. This was especially hard during COVID-19 because many LGBTQ+ members felt a tremendous amount of stress due to the isolation they felt from not disclosing their identity to their family. Those of the LGBTQ+ population who receive little or no family support and acceptance are three times more likely to have thoughts of suicide than those who do have a strong family support system behind them. Oftentimes, the lack of familial support is more conducive of detrimental behaviors, such as drug and illegal substance abuse, which can cause further harm to the individual. Multiple aspects of lifestyles, including religion, can affect family support. Those who have strong family ties to religion may be less likely to seek support and help from family members due to fear of a lack of acceptance within the family, as well as within the religious community.

Although mental health awareness has increased for the LGBTQ+ community, the aging citizens of this community are still struggling to have their voices heard. Research has shown that compared to heterosexuals and other groups in the LGBTQ+ community, older people have a higher incidence of suffering from mental health disorder. One of the most common reasons why older citizens refrain from seeking mental health care is due to the past discrimination by medical professionals. In addition to the lack of knowledge, this group is marginalized due to the lack of funding as most of the funds go to campaigns for the younger LGBTQ+ population.

=== Sex and gender disparities and predictors ===
While gender differences among those with mental health disorders are an underdeveloped field of study, there are gender specific aspects to life that cause disparities. Gender is often a determinant of the amount of power one has over factors in their life, such as socioeconomic status and social position, and the stressors that go along with these factors. The location of genders and sex within the social construct can be a great determinant of risks and predictors of mental health disorders. These disparities in gender can correlate to the disparities in the types of mental health disorders that individuals have. While all genders and sexes are at risk of a large variety of mental health illnesses, some illnesses and disorders are more common among one sex than another. Women are twice as likely as men to be diagnosed with forms of depression as depressive disorders account for close to 41.9% of the disability from neuropsychiatric disorders among women compared to 29.3% among men. On the other hand, men are three times more likely to be given a diagnosis of a social anxiety disorder than women.

Sex can also be a determinant of other aspects of mental health as well. The time of onset of symptoms can be different dependent on one's sex. Women are more likely to show signs of mental illnesses, such as depression, earlier and at a younger age than men. Many believe this to be a correlation with the onset time of puberty. As a result of social stigmas and stereotypes within society, women are also more likely to be prescribed mood-altering medications, whereas men are more likely to be prescribed medications for addictions. Further research on the mental health disparities among sex and gender is needed in order to gain a deeper knowledge of the predictors of mental health and the possible differences in treatments.

Adult women are at a high risk of experiencing mental health disorders during their pregnancy, however, most physicians do not address this until the postpartum period. With anxiety and depression being the most common ones, these disorders can affect both the pregnant woman and the baby's life. [6] The most common reasons for mental health disorders in this community were domestic abuse, fear of loneliness and previous medical history of mental disorders. The COVID-19 pandemic was a difficult time for those who were pregnant as isolation, one of the main causes for anxiety and depression, was mandated. Studies showed that during the pandemic, while the mental health of middle class pregnant women living in New York City improved, pregnant women living under a low socioeconomic status were more vulnerable to suffer from psychological disorders.

== Current initiatives in achieving mental health equality ==
Because mental health inequality is largely due to disparities in health insurance, ways to improve mental health equity must come from changes in healthcare policies. Much of mental health disparity comes from a lack of access to healthcare in low socioeconomic communities and, often, underprivileged minorities. This lack of access can arise from geographic isolation, poor funding and incentive for health care providers, inefficient health care coverage or highly stigmatized and discriminatory community attitudes surrounding mental health. Additionally, changing the content of healthcare literature and education to include mental health is equally important. The United States has made strides to break down the stigmas surrounding mental health, but the rate of such stigma is currently still on the rise. Mental health is also still not considered to be a significant part of basic health care plans, possibly due to high stigma and miseducation about mental illness. Potentially linked to such high stigma and miseducation, mental health is also still not considered to be a significant part of basic health care plans. For individuals to receive the treatment necessary for mental illness, it must first be acknowledged as a real, treatable illness.

In May 2013, the World Health Assembly adopted a new action plan to address mental health over the following eight years. This plan is called the Comprehensive Mental Health Action Plan 2013-2020. This plan is an indicator of the global importance of mental health and includes goals for global mental health improvement. This plan also addresses mental health inequalities through acknowledging the need for greater access in low and middle-income countries.

In 2021, the Comprehensive Mental Health Action Plan was extended by the World Health Organization to the year 2030. The plan now emphasizes incorporating mental health care into primary care fields by advocating for universal healthcare coverage and rejecting the idea of mental health care as a secondary healthcare benefit. Efforts outlined by the renewed plan include expanding Telehealth services, increasing workforce training, and redistributing care responsibilities.

Previous Research and Current Gaps

Mental health disparities among African American young men persist as a critical issue in the United States. Research indicates that this group faces numerous barriers to care, including treatment disparities, stigma, and systemic obstacles that reduce help-seeking behaviors. Despite the presence of support systems—such as family networks, faith-based organizations, community groups, and mentorship programs—their effectiveness in addressing mental health needs remains inconsistent.

Recent studies have underscored that African American men often define health and well-being through lenses of self-reliance and community support, rather than through conventional clinical frameworks. Culturally tailored interventions—which incorporate elements such as racial socialization, culturally relevant coping strategies, and recognition of social pressures—have shown promise in addressing these unique needs. Innovations in intervention delivery, including digital and social media platforms, have also been effective in reaching this traditionally underserved population.

Research over the past decade has revealed significant disparities in culturally responsive mental health interventions for young African American males. A comprehensive review by Henderson & Williams (2022) found that among 157 school-based mental health programs implemented between 2012 and 2022, only 8% specifically addressed the unique cultural needs of African American male students. This gap is particularly concerning given that African American male youth report mental health challenges at rates 40% higher than their white counterparts (Jones et al., 2022).

Meta-analyses show that culturally tailored interventions improve treatment outcomes by 45% compared to standard interventions (Thomas et al., 2023). With 48% of African American male adolescents reporting significant mental health challenges and only 25% receiving support (Jones et al., 2022), the need for interventions addressing the intersections of racial identity, masculinity, and historical trauma is well-documented.

The absence of culturally responsive interventions is particularly acute in urban educational settings. Research by Thomas et al. (2023) found that among 50 major urban school districts, only three had implemented comprehensive culturally specific mental health programs for African American male students. This lack of targeted intervention persists despite evidence showing that culturally adapted programs can increase engagement by 156% and improve outcomes by 89% (Carter et al., 2023).

The interplay of racial identity and traditional notions of masculinity creates unique stressors, including racial battle fatigue and discrimination-related stress, which compound the challenges of accessing mental health care (Smith et al., 2017; Novak et al., 2019). Additional factors such as geographic displacement and historical experiences of medical mistreatment further complicate these challenges.

Mental Health Initiative Alternatives Underway

The integration of service animals and emotional support animals (ESAs) as adjunctive therapeutic interventions for individuals experiencing mental health challenges represents a burgeoning area of clinical interest with promising empirical support. Contemporary research has illuminated the multifaceted psychophysiological benefits that emerge from the human-animal bond, particularly within populations struggling with conditions such as post-traumatic stress disorder, major depressive disorder, anxiety disorders, and autism spectrum conditions. These specially trained animals facilitate psychological well-being through several well-documented mechanisms: the reduction of cortisol levels and concomitant decrease in physiological stress responses; the promotion of oxytocin release during physical contact, which engenders feelings of security and attachment; the disruption of maladaptive rumination patterns through behavioral activation and mindful present-moment awareness; the amelioration of social isolation through increasing positive community interactions; and the cultivation of routine, responsibility, and purpose that may otherwise be diminished during periods of psychological distress (Johnson et al., 2022). The distinction between service animals and emotional support animals warrants clarification within this therapeutic context—service animals receive specialized training to perform specific tasks directly mitigating disability-related impairments, such as alerting to impending panic attacks or interrupting self-injurious behaviors, whereas emotional support animals provide generalized comfort through companionship without task-specific training. A longitudinal investigation by Rodriguez and colleagues (2021) demonstrated statistically significant reductions in psychiatric hospitalization rates among veterans with PTSD who were paired with service dogs, observing a 47% decrease in inpatient admissions and a 38% reduction in psychotropic medication usage over a three-year period compared to treatment-as-usual controls. This research further documented improvements in functional domains including sleep quality, interpersonal functioning, occupational engagement, and perceived quality of life among service animal recipients. The therapeutic efficacy appears particularly pronounced when the animal's presence enables individuals to navigate previously avoided situations, thereby facilitating exposure to anxiety-provoking stimuli within the safety context provided by the animal—a process analogous to the therapeutic mechanism underlying exposure-based cognitive-behavioral interventions. Despite methodological limitations in the extant literature, including small sample sizes, heterogeneity in animal training protocols, and challenges in establishing appropriate control conditions, the emerging evidence base suggests that animal-assisted interventions constitute a valuable complement to conventional psychotherapy and psychopharmacological approaches. Future research endeavors would benefit from rigorous randomized controlled trials, standardization of training parameters, and investigation of specific mechanisms of action to optimize this promising therapeutic modality that harnesses the evolutionary significance of human-animal relationships for contemporary psychological healing.

Achieving more resources for mental health care in rural areas

The Centers for Disease Control and Prevention reports that over 50% of areas with a mental health practitioner shortage are rural. The CDC recommends the use of telemedicine to provide virtual care to patients, providing easier access to essential services at a lower cost. The use of telemedicine has already become highly popular amongst individuals seeking care from the comfort of their homes. After the COVID-19 pandemic, many could not visit medical providers in person, and telemedicine provided a useful alternative that many still use post-pandemic. Telemedicine could prove to be a useful tool for rural citizens who cannot easily access good quality mental health services. Many rural schools have begun to implement school-based mental health services, which have proved to be effective, cost-friendly, and timely. Springer researchers surveyed parents and teachers from rural communities on their opinions regarding what needs to be done to address student mental health concerns. The main takeaway was the need for mental health support teams within the school who can provide high quality care for students with behavioral issues or mental health concerns. Integrating this service into the school makes care more accessible and may normalize mental health care within the community by creating a mutual understanding. Participants from the Springer survey reported that having a small community improved their relationships with mental health care providers, as the providers could cultivate more personal relationships with their patients due to their smaller caseloads. The CDC also backs up the use of school-based mental health services, reporting that about 35% of school-based health care centers were found in rural areas. The CDC adds that the schools tend to be a central point for many rural citizens, and that by providing school-based health care services it becomes more accessible to receive treatment for a variety of conditions, most notably anxiety, trauma, ADHD, and depression.

== Global mental health inequalities ==
There is major inequality in the mental health field on a global scale, especially in developing countries. The number of people with a mental health condition is substantial, while clinicians are under-appreciated and under resourced.

Around 30% of people globally suffer from a mental disorder in any given year, and more than two thirds of those individuals do not receive the necessary care. The most common mental health disorders globally are depression, alcohol and substance abuse, and psychosis. The consequences of mental health inequalities include unneeded suffering and premature death, increased stigma and marginalization, a lack of investment in mental health workforce and infrastructure and limited or no treatment for people suffering from these conditions.

The burden of unmet mental health needs perpetuates a cycle of inequalities that impact a person's overall health and wellbeing. Many developing countries lack policies that address the basic needs and rights of people suffering from mental illnesses. According to research, patients in developing countries frequently leave hospitals without knowing their diagnosis or what medications they are taking, they wait too long for referrals, appointments, and treatment, and they are not respected or given adequate emotional support.

There is astounding disparity that exists between the prevalence of mental problems around the world and the resources available for mental health. Globally, only 2% of national budgets are devoted to mental health. Due to a lack of finances and the ability to adequately treat their patients, some nations merely have warehouses to serve as hospitals where patients are isolated from the rest of society. The few psychiatric hospitals that do exist in developing countries are frequently overcrowded, understaffed, and may not offer the necessary level of care. Most psychiatric hospitals are located in urban areas, away from family members, which increases social isolation and costs for families. Integrating mental health into primary health care could help solve these problems on a global scale.

== Adolescent mental health ==
Mental health is as an ongoing issue for adolescents. Researchers claim that preventing mental health problems, which commonly start in adolescence, is both doable and necessary. Schools have emerged as a target for involvement due to the high number of young people who experience mental health issues and the low number of those who have access to expensive and time-consuming therapies. Studies have demonstrated that preventative programs that take place in clinics or other healthcare settings are more beneficial to teenagers, despite the possibility that they may be successful in schools. Social media may be a valuable resource for young people who are socially isolated and who are struggling with mental health issues. But, especially in girls and underrepresented groups, social media use has also been related to sadness, suicide, and self-harm.

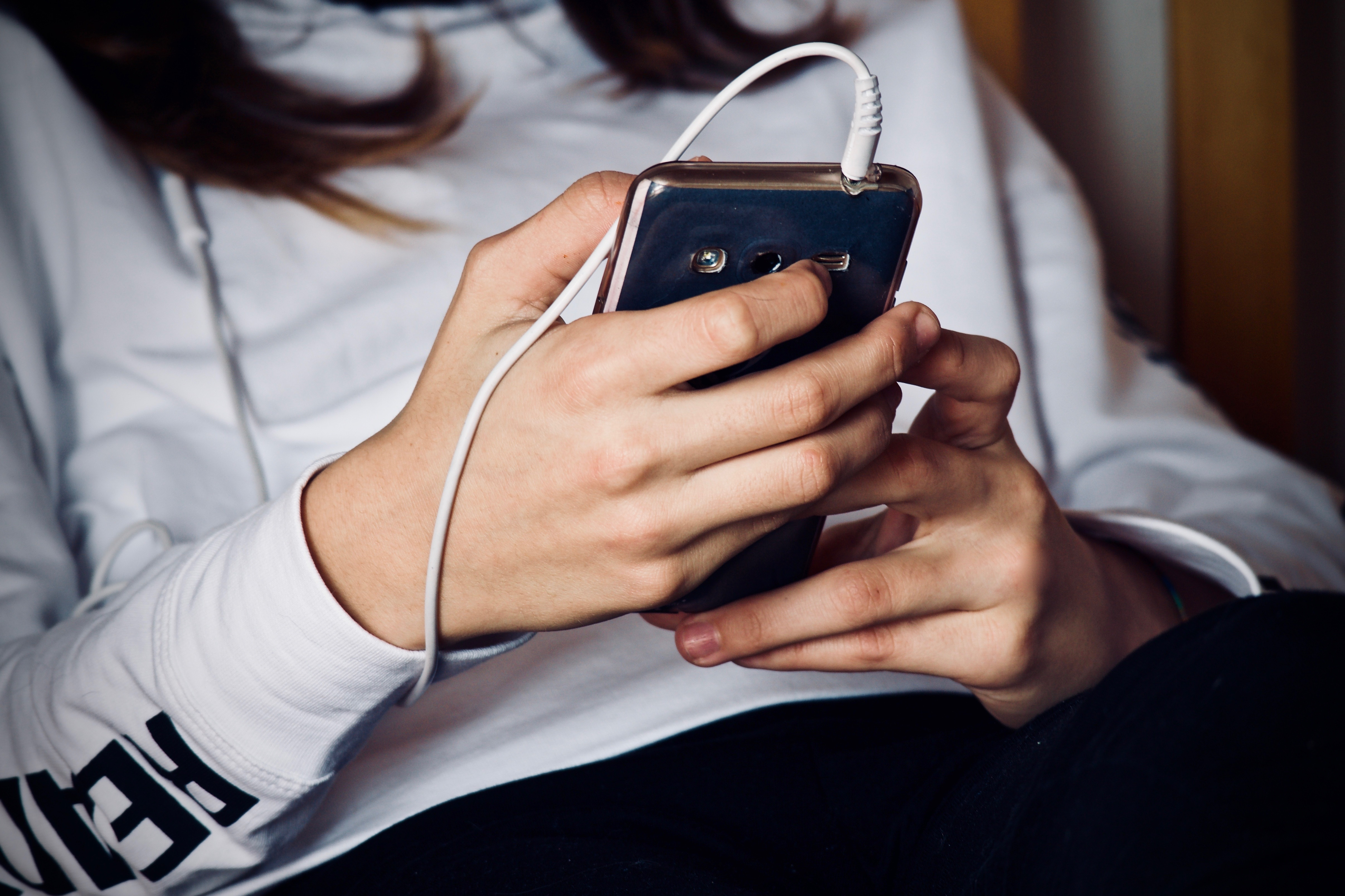
Smartphone

By facilitating easier access to interventions and resources that have been scientifically proven effective as well as by simplifying some steps in the diagnostic, monitoring, and health indicators, digital technologies have the potential to revolutionize the way that services for young people with mental health issues are provided. There has been efforts to try and address mental health in adolescents and the lack of mental health resources. For example, the WHO (World Health Organization) has developed an initiative called HAT (Helping Adolescents Thrive) which aims to advocate for better mental health programs. Though, studies have shown that the need for mental health resources has increased while accessibility has decreased. There are many ways mental health can effects an adolescents directly and indirectly. Lower grades, conflicts with parents and a lack of social relationship are few of the indirect ways a child can be effects. Whereas, changes in mood states, is one sign of a direct effect of mental health on adolescents.

== See also ==
- Acculturation
- Health equity
- Immigrant paradox
- Social determinants of mental health
- Social medicine
