= Sex differences in schizophrenia =

Sex differences in schizophrenia are widely reported. Men and women exhibit different rates of incidence and prevalence, age at onset, symptom expression, course of illness, and response to treatment. Reviews of the literature suggest that understanding the implications of sex differences on schizophrenia may help inform individualized treatment and positively affect outcomes.

== Incidence and prevalence ==
For both men and women, incidence of schizophrenia onset peaks at multiple points across the lifespan. For men, the highest frequency of incidence onset occurs in the early twenties and there is evidence of a second peak in the mid-thirties. For women, there is a similar pattern with peaks in the early twenties and middle age. Studies have also demonstrated a tertiary peak for women in the early sixties. Men have higher frequency rates of onset than women from the early twenties to middle age, and women have higher frequency rates of onset starting in late middle age.

Studies from 2005 and 2008 documenting prevalence rates of schizophrenia estimate that the lifetime likelihood of developing the disorder is 0.3–0.7%, and did not find evidence of sex differences. However, other studies have found a higher prevalence and severity in males than females.

== Clinical presentation ==
Symptom expression systematically differs between men and women. Women are more likely to experience high levels of depressive symptoms (i.e., low mood, anhedonia, fatigue) at illness onset and over the course of illness. Men are more likely to experience more negative symptoms than women at illness onset. There is conflicting evidence related to sex differences in the expression of positive symptoms. Some studies have found that women are more likely to experience positive symptoms. Other studies have found no significant sex differences in the expression of positive symptoms. Younger age of onset is also related to earlier hospitalizations in men and more acute symptom severity in women.

Ties have been found between schizophrenic women's estrogen levels and their level of schizophrenia symptoms. Such women have sometimes been found to benefit from hormonal treatment. Menstrual psychosis and postpartum psychosis may in some cases be linked to an underlying schizophrenic condition. During a study conducted with a sample of 272 schizophrenia patients separated by four age groups and gender adults <35, 35–65, 65–80, >80 data was collected comparing specific schizophrenia symptoms and nonspecific symptoms seen in other psychiatric disorders. They used the BPRS (Brief Psychiatric Rating Scale) assessing (SANS) Scale for Assessment of Negative Symptoms and (SAPS) Scale for Assessment of Positive Symptoms. Where they gathered and provided data regarding the hypothesis of sex and age differences in symptoms and severity with schizophrenia. This study showed that men reflected higher severity of negative symptoms than women for all age groups (<35 and 35–65) except for the last two elderly (65-80 and >80) age groups, where women experience higher severity and more negative symptoms then men (Gur et al., 1996). This makes us wonder if the theory of decreased estrogen may be the cause of the second peak in women around menopause. It is known that women experience severe symptoms during low levels of estrogen for example during menstrual cycles.

== Differences course of illness and treatment outcomes ==
=== Course of illness and treatment outcomes ===
Longitudinal studies have found evidence of sex differences in presence of psychosis, global outcome, and recovery across periods of 15–20 years. Several studies have demonstrated that women with schizophrenia are more likely to exhibit significantly greater reduction in psychotic symptoms, as well as better cognitive and global functioning relative to men. Additionally, studies have found that women are more likely to experience a period of recovery across the lifespan than men. Further, there is consistent evidence of higher mortality rates, suicide attempts and completions, homelessness, poorer family and social support in men compared to women. It is currently unclear the extent to which these observed differences can be attributed to age of onset.

Some studies demonstrate that age at illness onset likely contributes to observed sex differences in course of illness and treatment outcomes. Increased negative and cognitive symptoms and poorer overall treatment outcomes are both related to younger age at onset, while fewer negative and cognitive symptoms are associated with older age at onset. These findings are consistent with the patterns of symptom expression observed in men and women and the relative age of onset for each gender. It is possible that men are more likely to experience poorer overall outcomes than women because of the relationship between younger age at onset and symptom severity. However, some longitudinal studies have found that sex is a unique predictor of functional outcome over and above the effects of age.

=== Differences in response to antipsychotic medications ===
Clinical trials examining sex differences in the efficacy of atypical antipsychotic medications found greater rates of symptom reduction in women compared to men. However, women are at a greater risk for experiencing weight gain and developing metabolic syndrome as a result of antipsychotic medication use. It is possible, however, that these differences in treatment response may be confounded by sex differences in clinical symptom severity and age at illness onset described above.

== Factors contributing to sex differences ==
=== Biological factors ===
The steroids and hormones associated with sex differentiation during fetal development have critical effects on neuronal development in humans, and there is evidence that these hormones have implications for sex differences in brain abnormalities observed in adults with schizophrenia. MRI studies have revealed more severe brain damage in men diagnosed with schizophrenia than women. Specifically, larger lateral and third ventricles and reduced volumes of critical regions such as the hippocampus, amygdala, and prefrontal cortical regions have been observed in men. These brain abnormalities likely contribute to the observed short-term and long-term memory deficits in men diagnosed with schizophrenia. It has been hypothesized that estrogen may serve a protective role in female development, buffering against the development of pervasive damage to this region. Further support for this hypothesis derives from the observation of a third peak of onset for women after menopause, which is associated with a reduction of estrogen, and the increased response to treatment in pre-menopausal women compared to post-menopausal women. Additionally, there is evidence that estradiol may be an effective adjunct to antipsychotic medication in reducing psychotic symptoms.

=== Social and environmental factors ===
==== Social cognition and social functioning ====
Premorbid social functioning and social cognition, robust predictors of relapse in this population, differ significantly between men and women. Men have poorer overall premorbid social functioning and social cognition, which is associated with higher rates of isolation, loneliness, and lower quality of life. Social cognitive and functional deficits are also related to the increased expression of negative symptoms observed in men. Additionally, these factors are also associated with reduced social network size and lower marriage rates in men with schizophrenia compared to women. Younger age at onset in men may also negatively impact community reintegration following the illness onset by delaying the development of life skills necessary to develop strong social support networks and foster self-perceptions of efficacy and agency.

==== Substance abuse and dependence ====
Sex-related differences in substance use and dependence have been observed in individuals with schizophrenia and those at risk for developing the illness. In early adolescence, sex-related differences in cannabis use have been observed, with males using more heavily than females in the general population and in those at risk for developing schizophrenia. There is evidence that these differences could in part be attributed to the predictive relationship between levels of testosterone in early adolescence and later cannabis use and dependence. Frequent cannabis use in early adolescence may be a risk factor for developing schizophrenia in men. There is some evidence that heavy, early cannabis use may be associated with impeded cortical maturation in males at a high risk for developing schizophrenia, potentially accelerating the course of illness in these individuals.

Substance abuse is also highly correlated with poorer functional outcomes and can significantly influence the course of illness. Current research estimates that 36% of men have a history of illicit substance use versus 16% of women. Nicotine dependence is also highly prevalent in individuals with schizophrenia. An estimated 80% of individuals with schizophrenia smoke cigarettes compared to 20% of the general population. Men with schizophrenia are more likely to start smoking than women, but social factors associated with mental illness contributing to increased rate of smoking in both genders.
