= Letter Carriers' Monument =

Public sculpture in Wisconsin

- Artist: Elliot Offner
- Year: 1989
- Type: Bronze monument
- Dimensions: 170 cm × 170 cm × 140 cm (66 in × 67 in × 56 in)
- Location: North Plankinton Ave. and West Wells St., Milwaukee; 43°2′25.16″N 87°54′46.133″W
- Owner: Administered by the City of Milwaukee

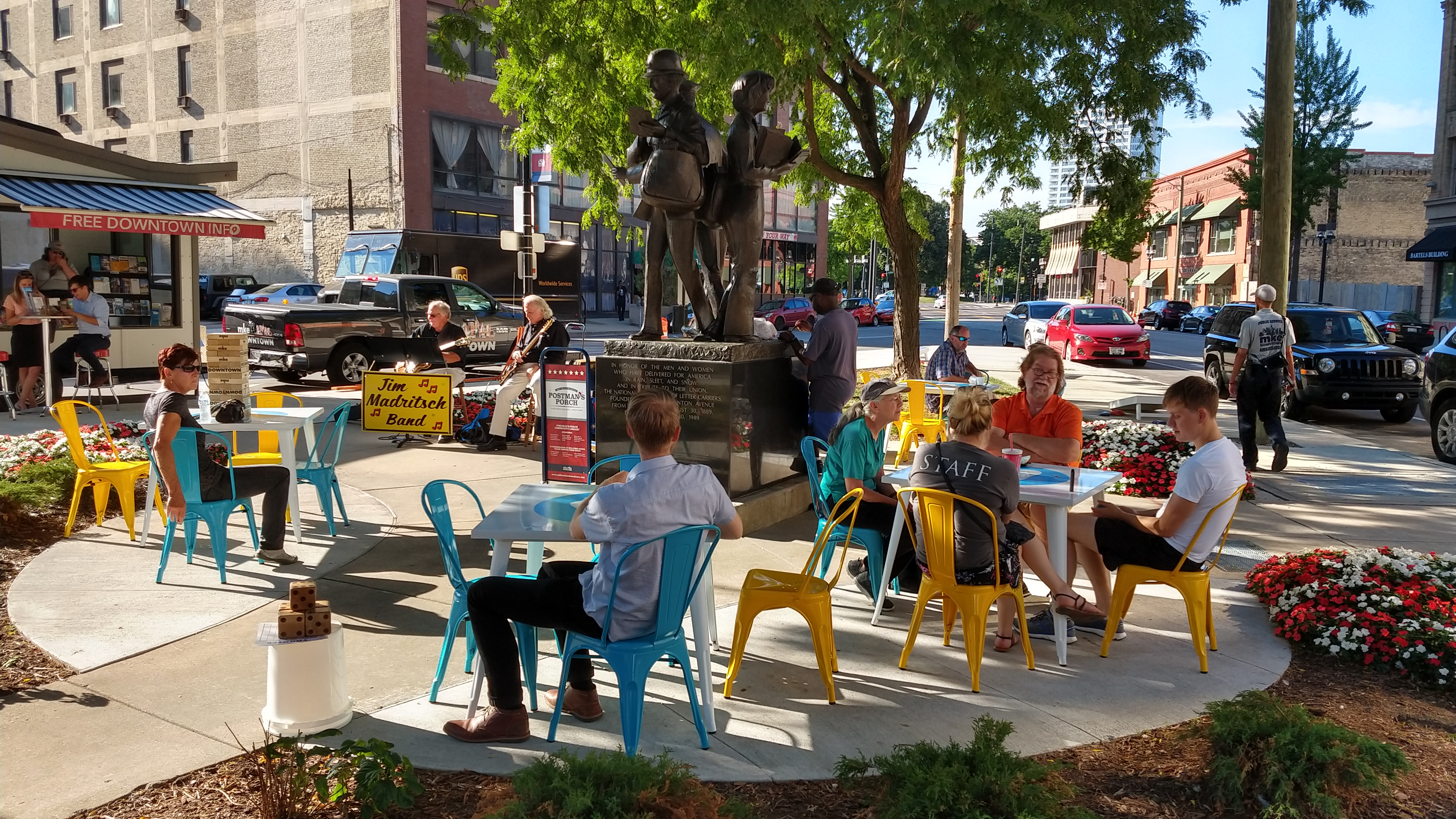
Postman's Porch Unplugged

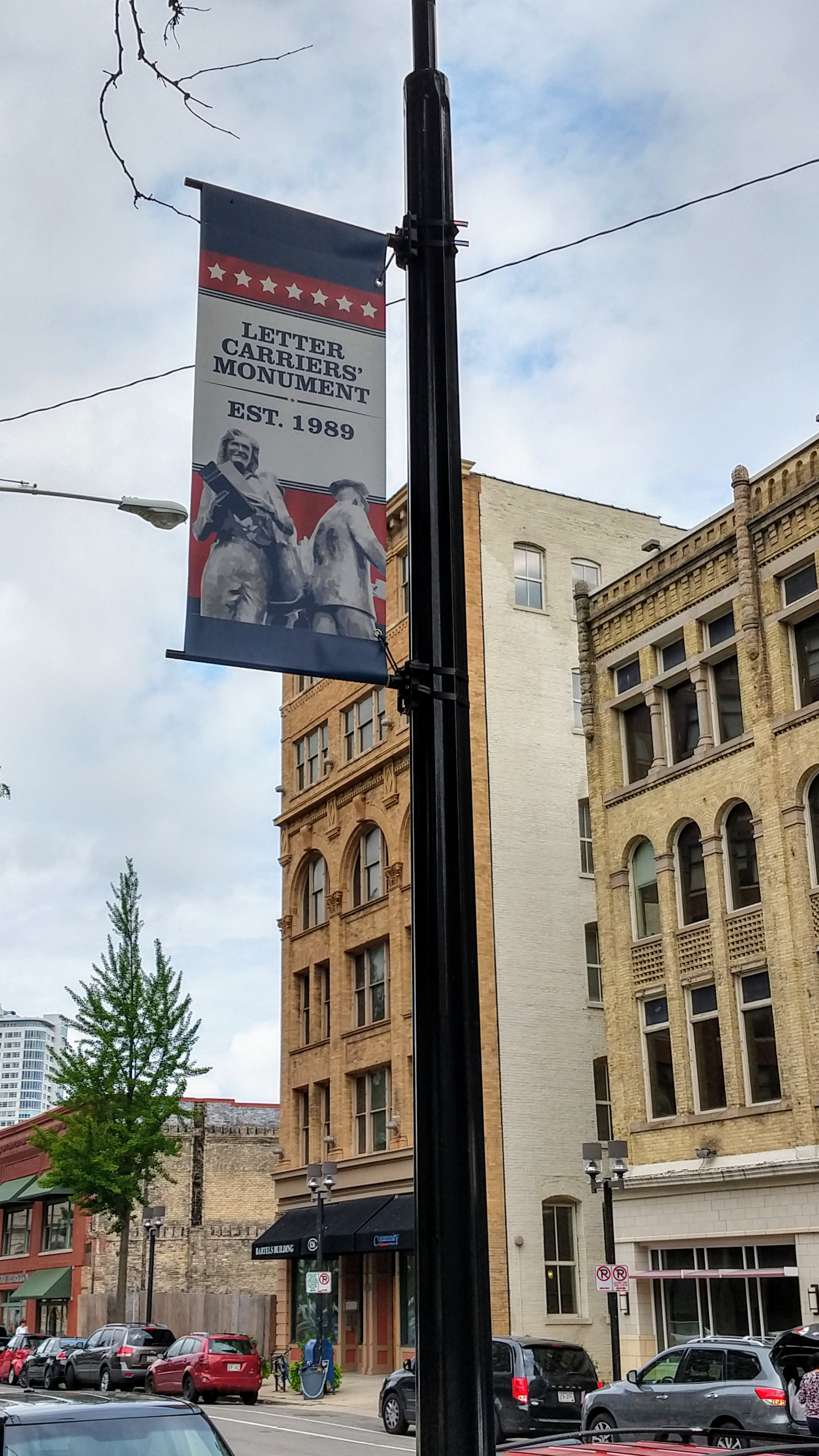
Banners at Postman Square

The Letter Carriers' Monument is a piece of public art by American artist Elliot Offner, located on a triangular plot formed by North 2nd Street, North Plankinton Avenue and West Wells Street in downtown Milwaukee, Wisconsin, in the United States. Created in 1989, the monument depicts three letter carriers and was commissioned in celebration of the centennial of the National Association of Letter Carriers (NALC).

== Description and history ==
The bronze sculpture depicts three figures representing letter carriers from across NALC's history: A white man with a mustache wearing a turn of the 20th century uniform (with an inscription on the jacket reading "Offner '89"); an African American man wearing a 1939 uniform (from the time of NALC's fiftieth anniversary); and a woman in a contemporary uniform. The sculpture is set on a black granite base, with the north and south faces of the base reading: "In honor of the men and women/ who have delivered for America/ in rain, sleet, and snow./ And in tribute to their Union,/ the National Association of Letter Carriers,/ founded across Plankinton Avenue/ from this site on August 30, 1889./ Dedicated August 30, 1989." The monument measures 66 x 67 x 56 inches, and was created in 1989.

The sculpture is a tribute to the National Association of Letter Carriers, commissioned to celebrate the centennial of its founding. The group's history began when the United States Postal Service gave employment preference to veterans after the American Civil War. As a result, there were many veterans employed by the Postal Service across the United States. After the Postal Service administration refused to recognize the eight-hour day, a group of veteran Milwaukee postal workers organized 60 postal worker veterans from 18 states who met in a tavern on Plankinton Avenue (the building, now used for storage by Renaissance Books, formerly housed the headquarters of Manpower Inc.) on August 30, 1889, immediately following the national encampment of the Grand Army of the Republic in Milwaukee. The postal workers agreed to form the National Association of Letter Carriers, demanding an eight-hour work day, a higher pay scale, a pension plan, and service stripes for every four years of service.

Elliot Offner was commissioned through the Franz Bader Gallery in New York to create the monument. He built the maquette in Cambridge, England while he was there as a visiting artist. He then worked with the Tallix Foundry in Beacon, New York to cast the sculpture. The work was sent to Milwaukee by truck from New York.

Centennial celebrations lasted four days and included a parade, exhibits and the dedication of the monument by Vincent R. Sombrotto, NALC's president. More than four thousand letter carriers and their families attended the festivities. The U.S. Postal Service issued a postage stamp (designed by Jack Davis) depicting three contemporary letter carriers, to commemorate the centennial day.

Buck and Palmer's 1995 Outdoor Sculpture in Milwaukee: A Cultural and Historical Guidebook observes: "The downtown Milwaukee site of the monument is correct in a historical sense, but unsuccessful in its public presence. Site considerations for the monument were overlooked and it stands on the small crowded triangle with annoying awkwardness."

== Postman Square / Postman's Porch ==
In 2016, the small triangular pocket park around the statue, known as Postman Square, was improved with new furniture to encourage lunch hour visitors.

In 2019, the space was improved again and re-christened Postman's Porch. The space was redesigned to become more open by removing hedges and adding additional plaza space. Reading materials, tables and chairs and festive banners were also added. A series of concerts were held to create a spirit of community gathering.
