= Offner =

Offner is a surname. Notable people with the surname include:

- Arnold A. Offner, (1937-), American historian
- Deborah Offner, American actress
- Elliot Offner (1931–2010), American sculptor
- Mortimer Offner (1900–1965), American photographer
- Paul Offner (1942–2004), American educator, public health expert and legislator
- Raymond Offner (1927–1989), French basketball player
- Richard Offner (1889-1965), Austrian-American art historian
- Stacy Offner, American rabbi

== See also ==
- Ofner
