= Stache for cash =

Stache for cash is a method for raising funds by growing a mustache and seeking out pledges for a specific charitable cause.

== Standard process ==
1. Participants are notified in advance to secure participation and begin growing mustache.
2. Some form of marketing materials—generally T-shirts or campaign buttons—are made and distributed before the fundraiser begins.
3. The fundraiser lasts for 1 month .
4. Participants wear the campaign button and the mustache, and whenever asked about the button and 'stache, a conversation is started about the cause and participant asks the observer for a small donation.

== Competition ==
A competition is generally held for multiple prizes. A photo contest is held for the best beard, the biggest beard, and the best attempt at a beard. Award Certificates are then issued to the winners.

A prize is also sometimes awarded for the participant that raises the most money for the cause.
