= Ofner =

Ofner is a German surname. Notable people with the surname include:

- Harald Ofner (1932–2026), Austrian lawyer and politician for the Freedom Party of Austria (FPÖ)
- Katrin Ofner (born 1990), Austrian freestyle skier
- Klaus Ofner (born 1968), Austrian Nordic combined skier
- Sebastian Ofner (born 1996), Austrian tennis player

== See also ==
- Offner
