= Pencil moustache =

Facial hair style

A pencil moustache is a thin moustache found adjacent to, or a little above the lip. The style is neatly clipped, so that the moustache takes the form of a thin line, as if it had been drawn using a pencil. A large gap is left between the nose and the moustache. The line of facial hair either breaks across the philtrum, or continues unbroken. In some versions, the line of hair extends vertically along the outside of the philtrum before stopping just below the nose, leaving the philtrum unbridged.

== Notable persons who have worn pencil moustaches ==
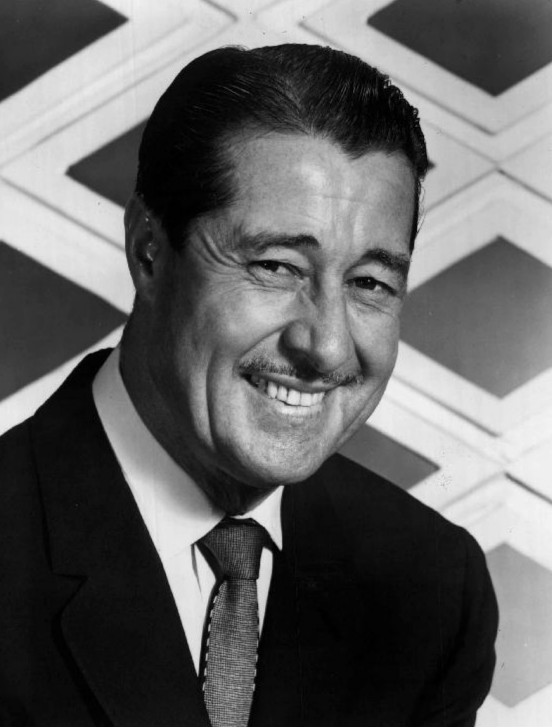
Don Ameche

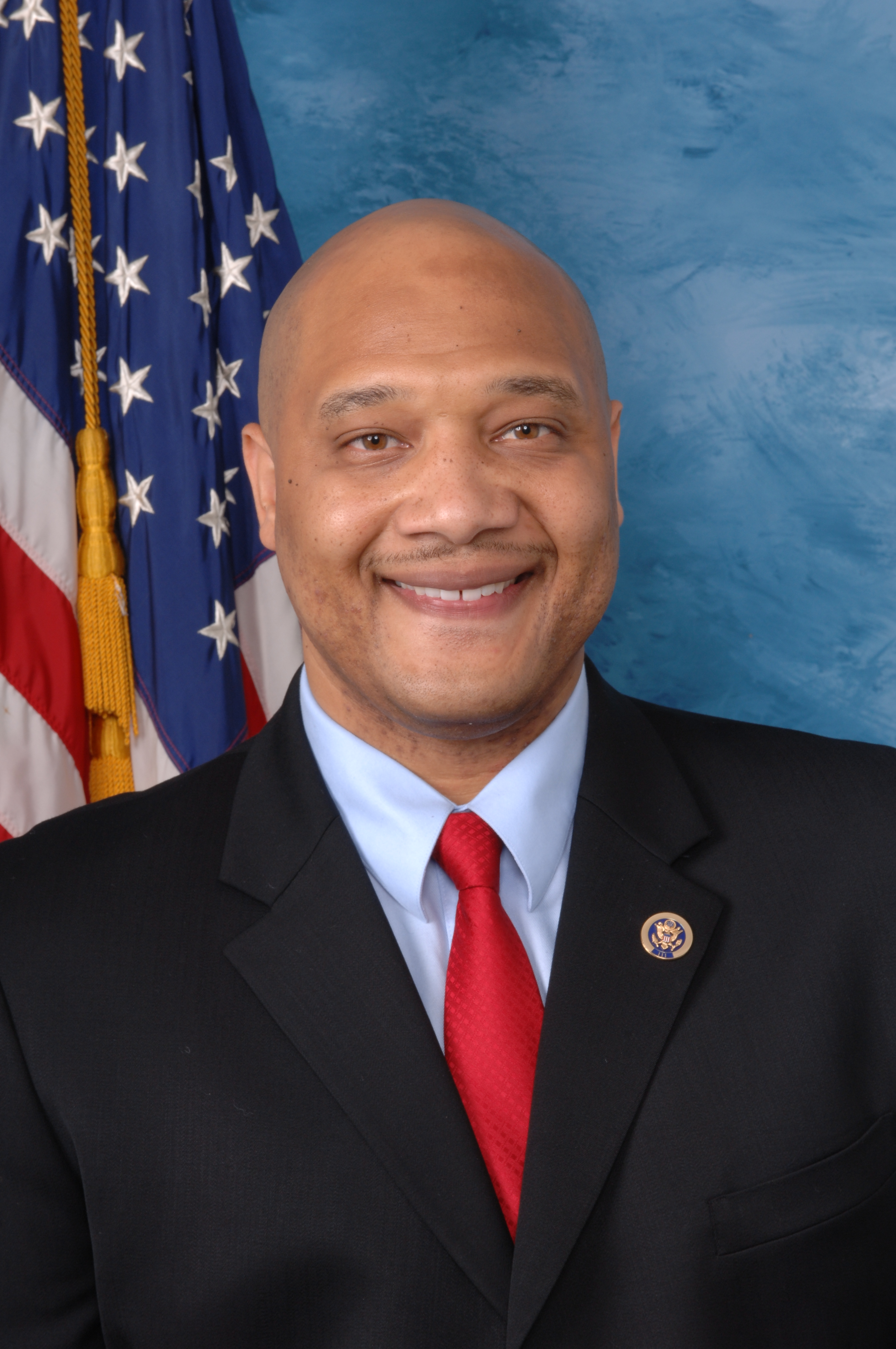
André Carson

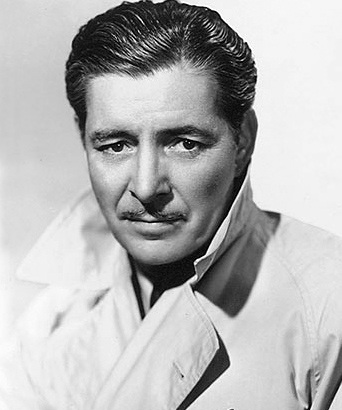
Ronald Colman

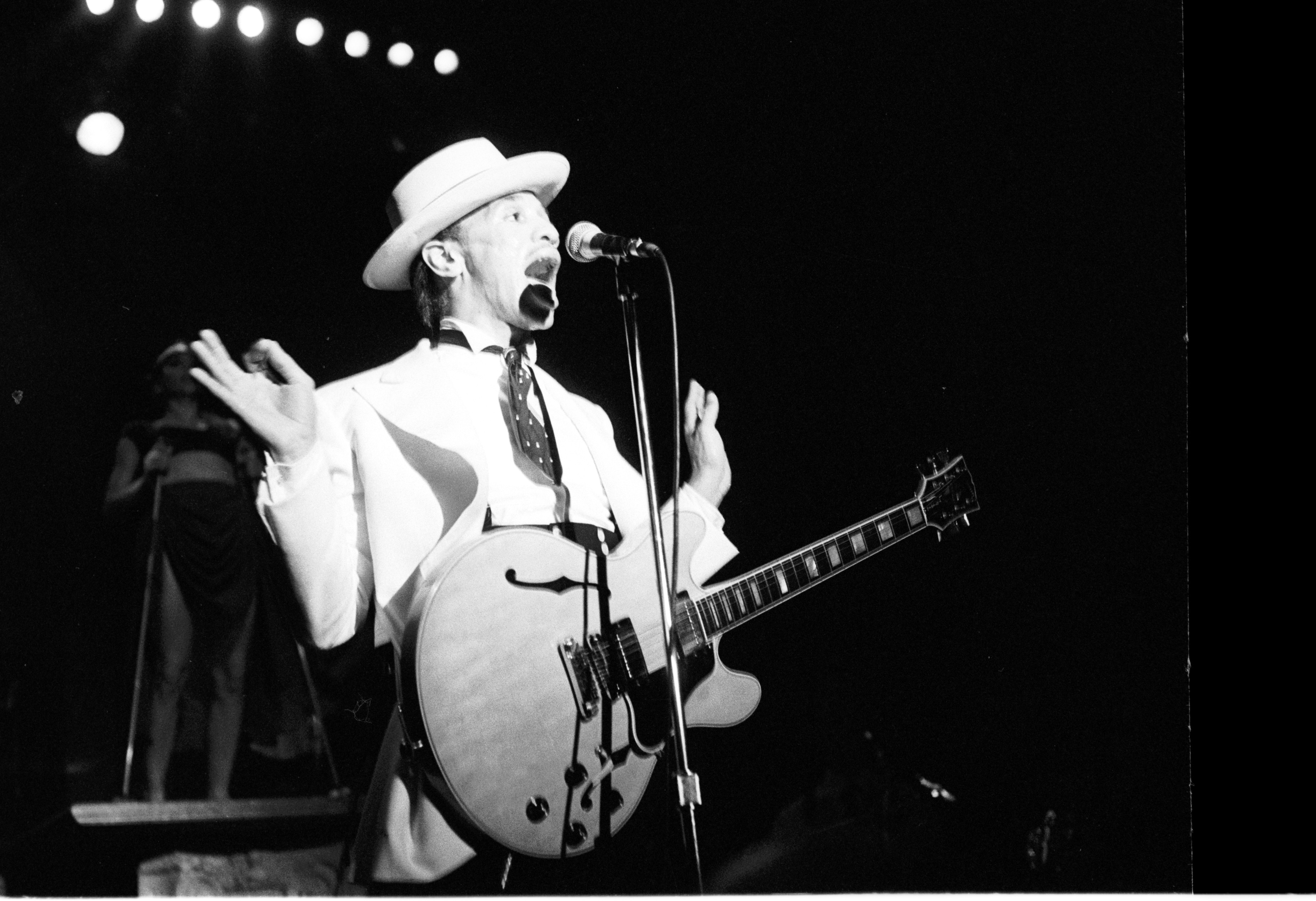
August Darnell

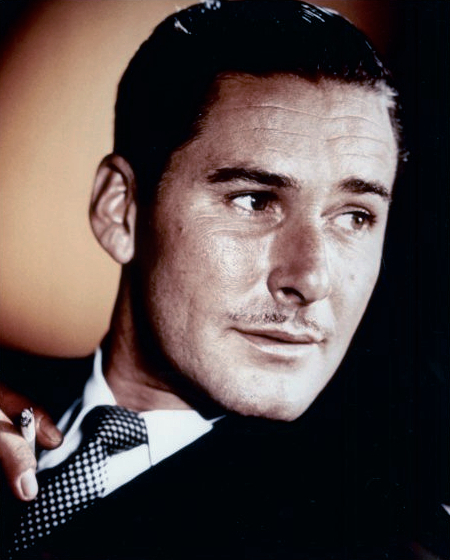
Errol Flynn

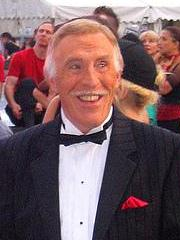
Sir Bruce Forsyth

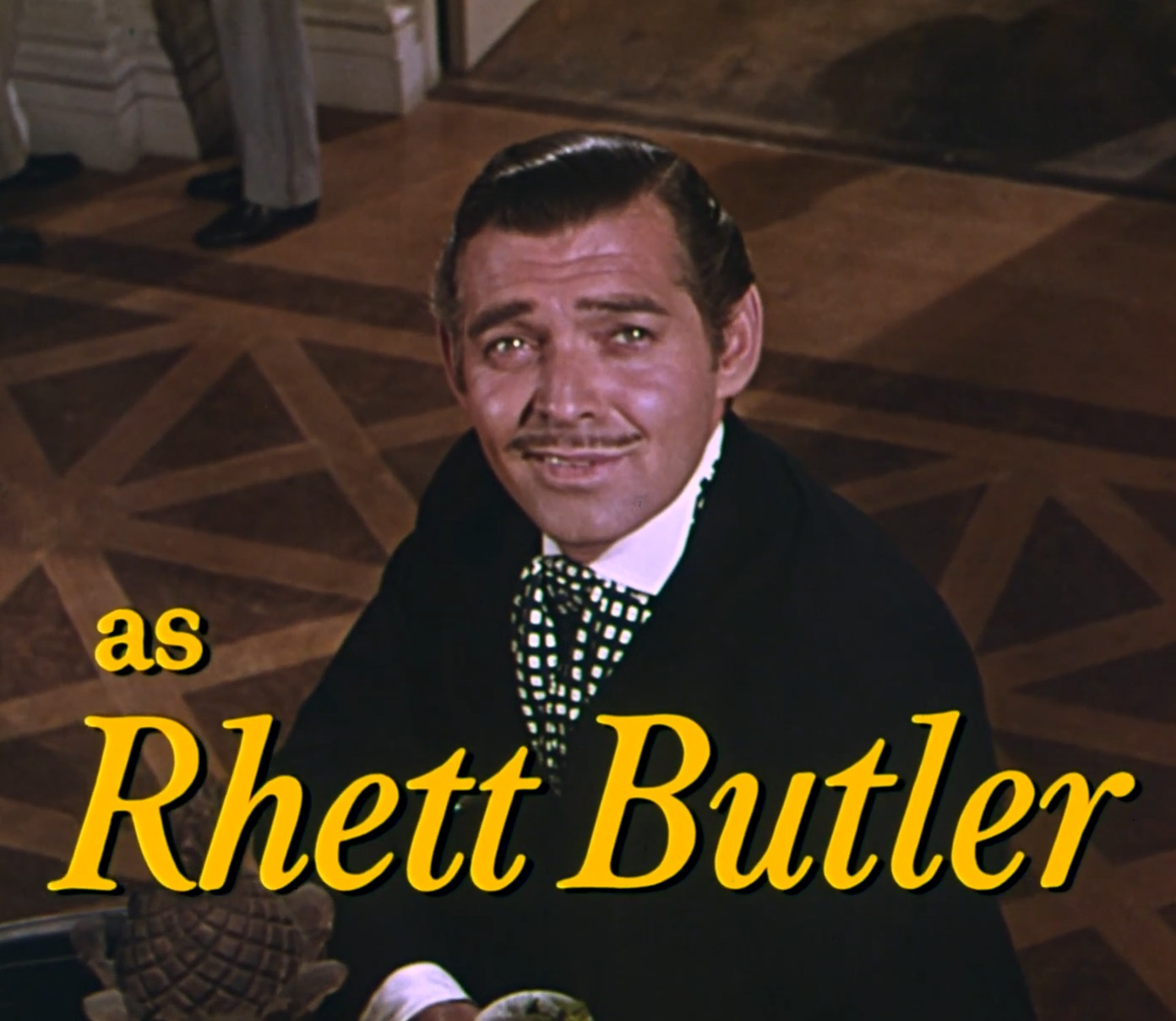
Clark Gable

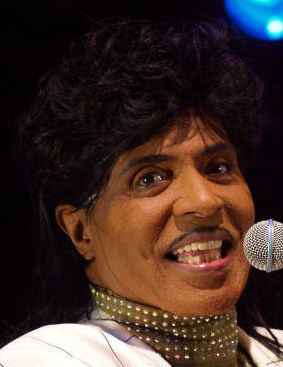
Little Richard

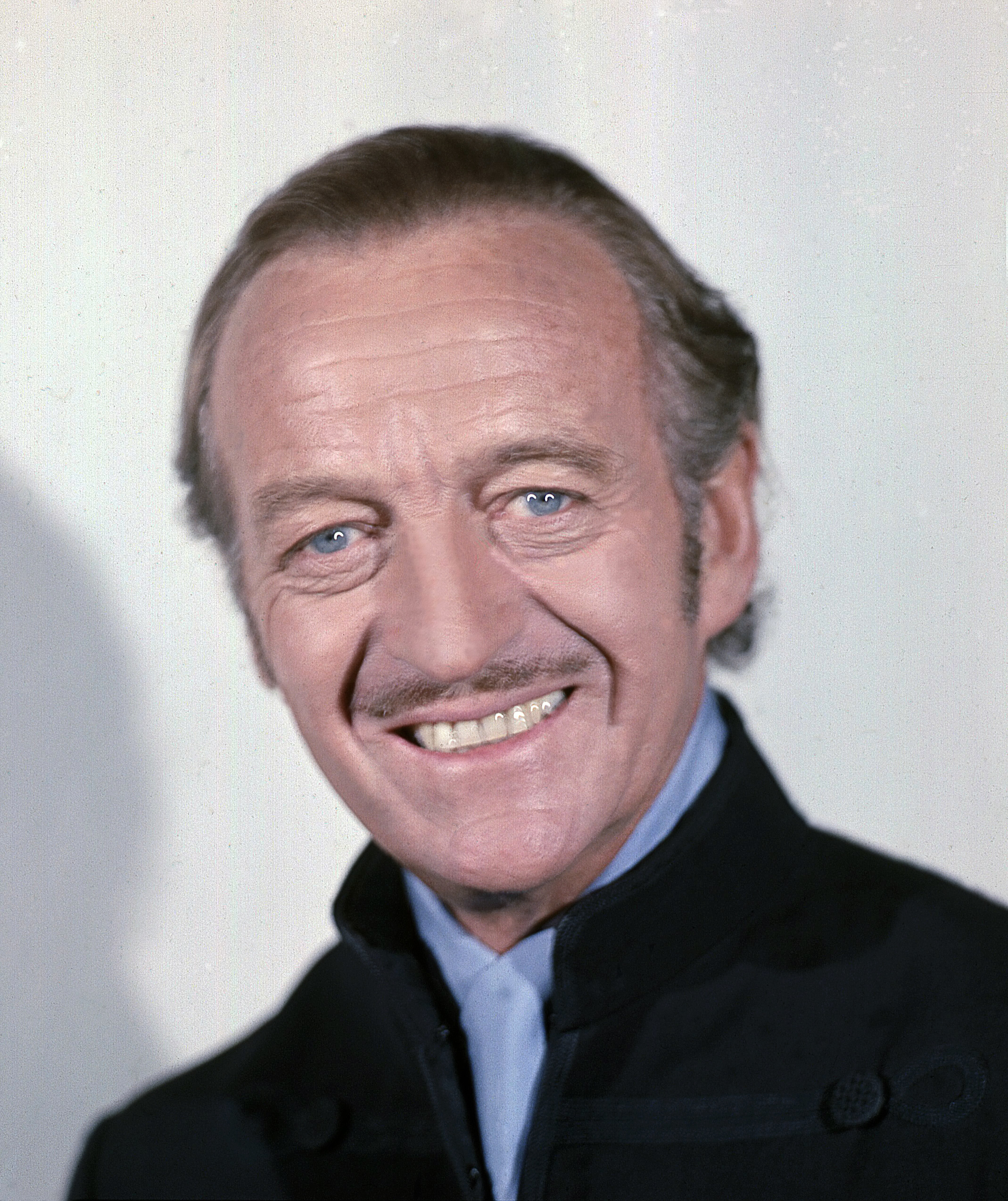
David Niven

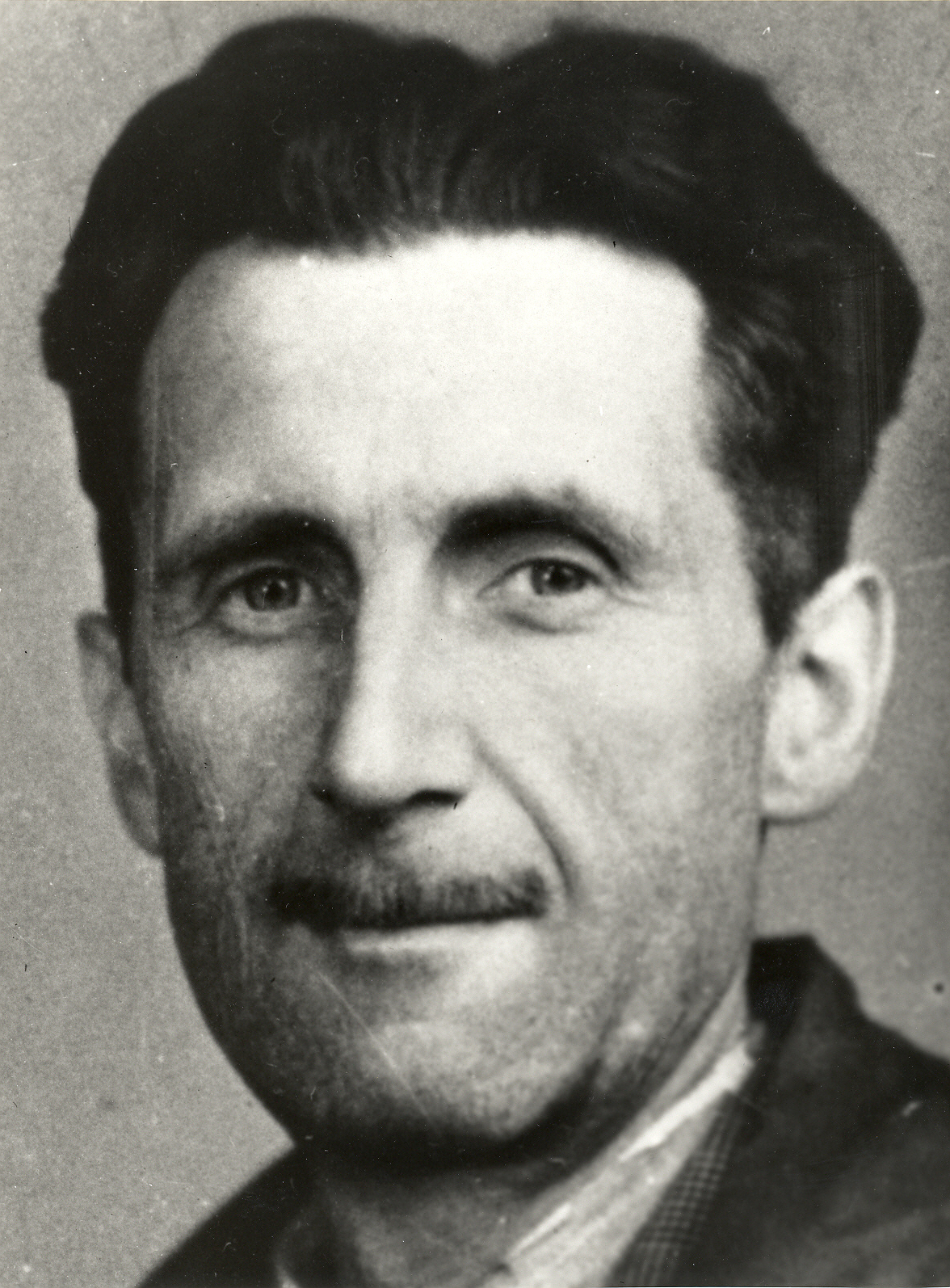
George Orwell

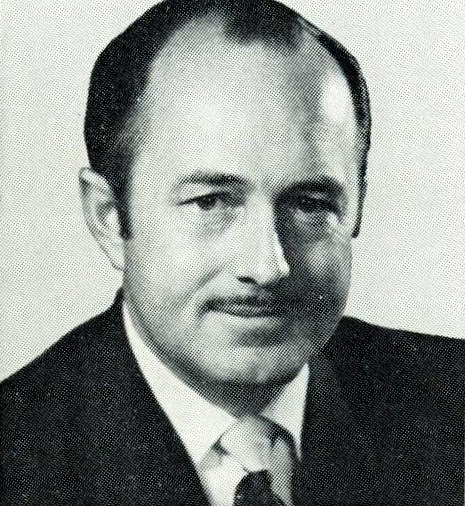
John G. Schmitz

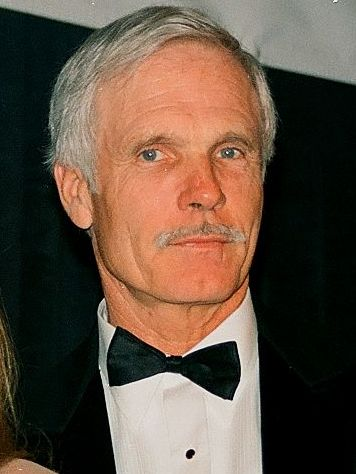
Ted Turner

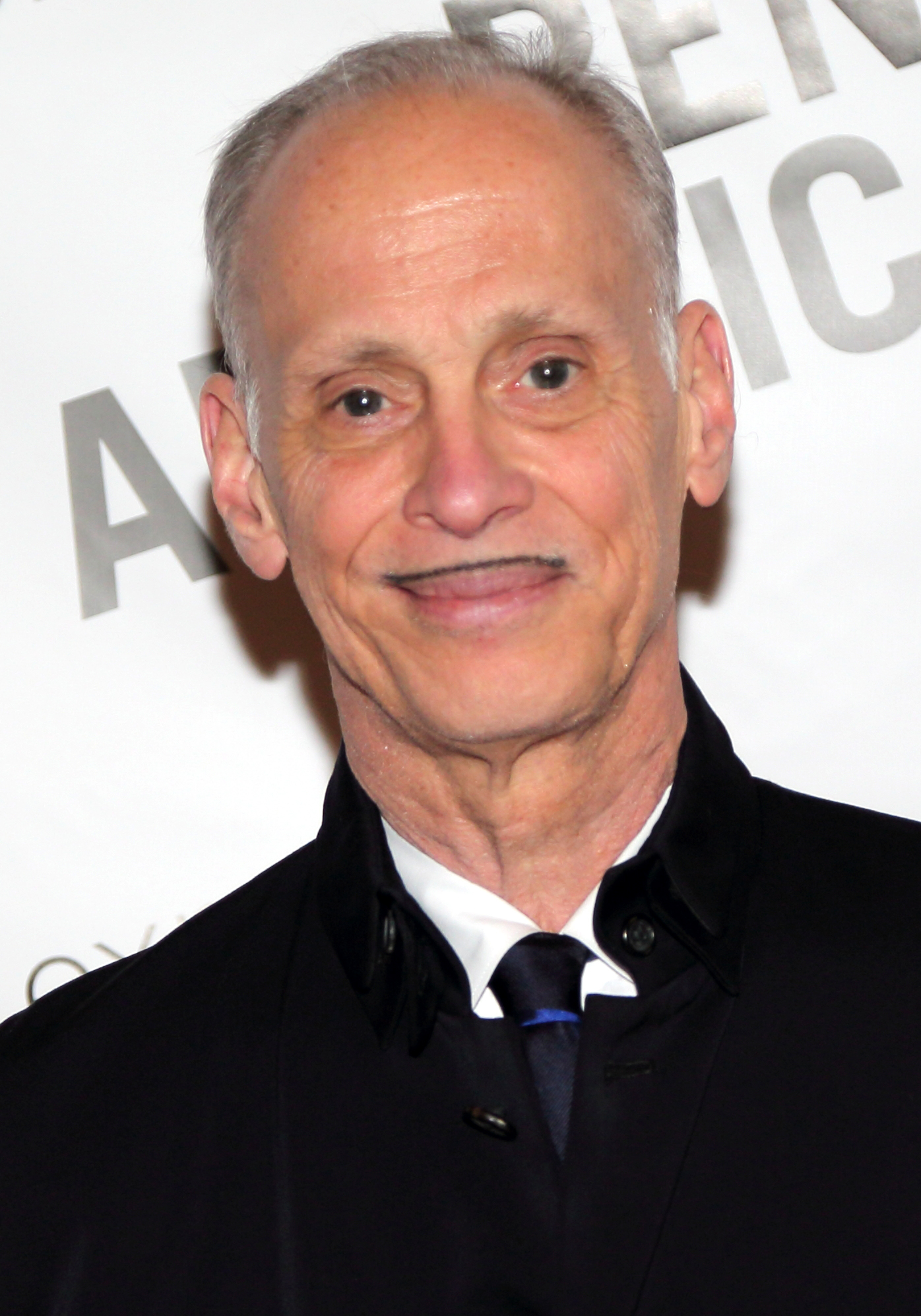
John Waters

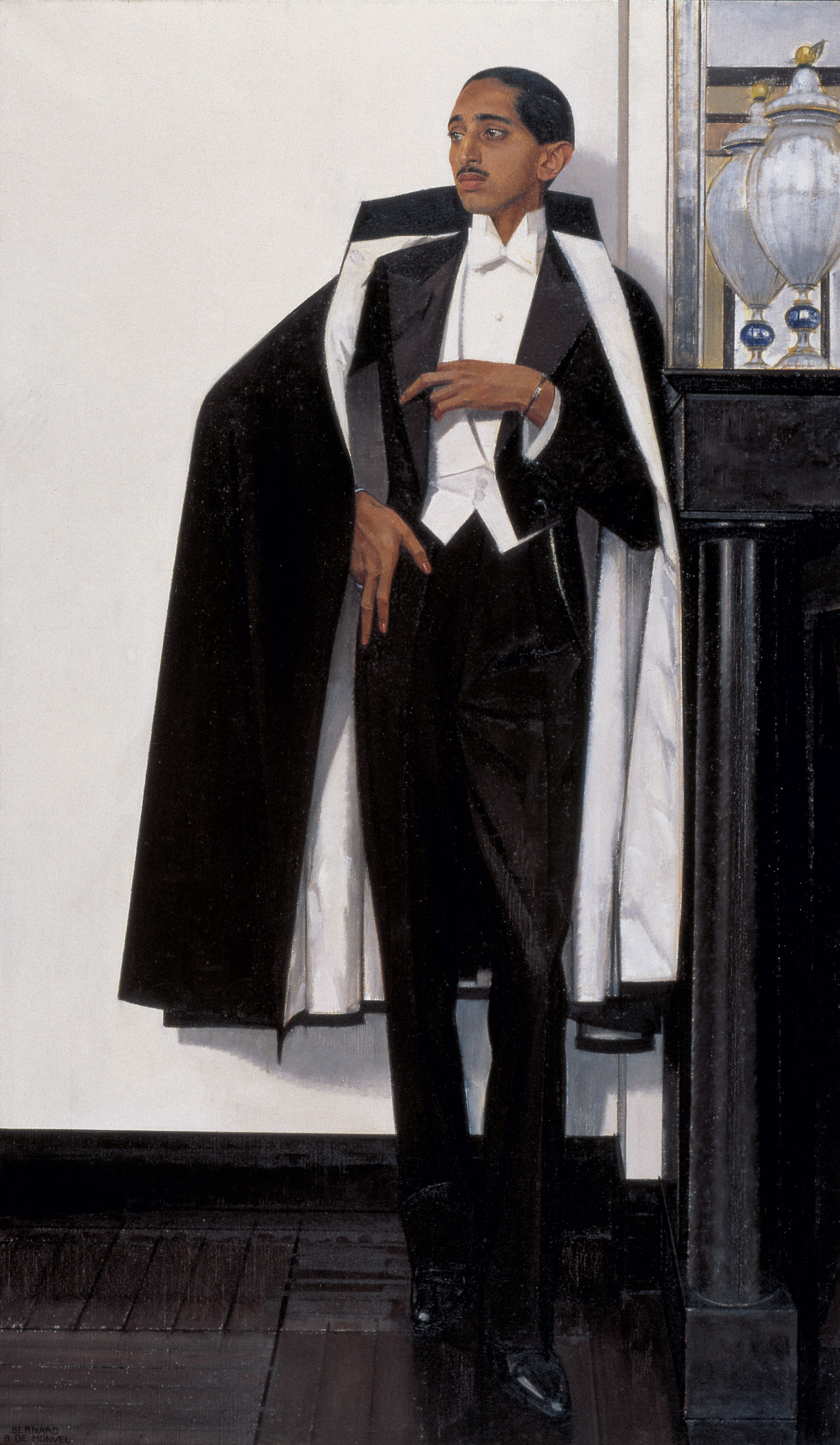
Yashwant Rao Holkar II

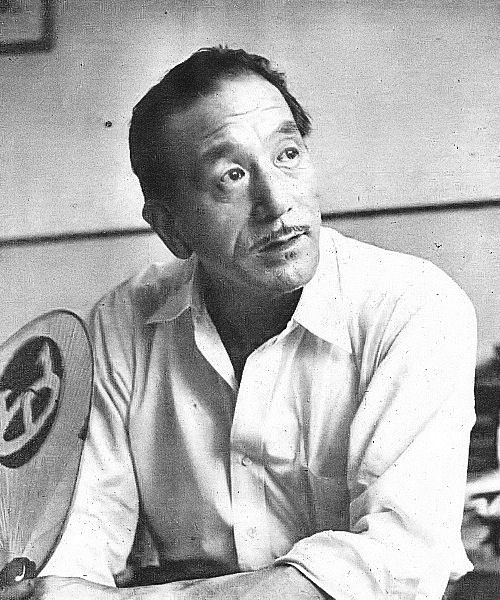
Yasujiro Ozu

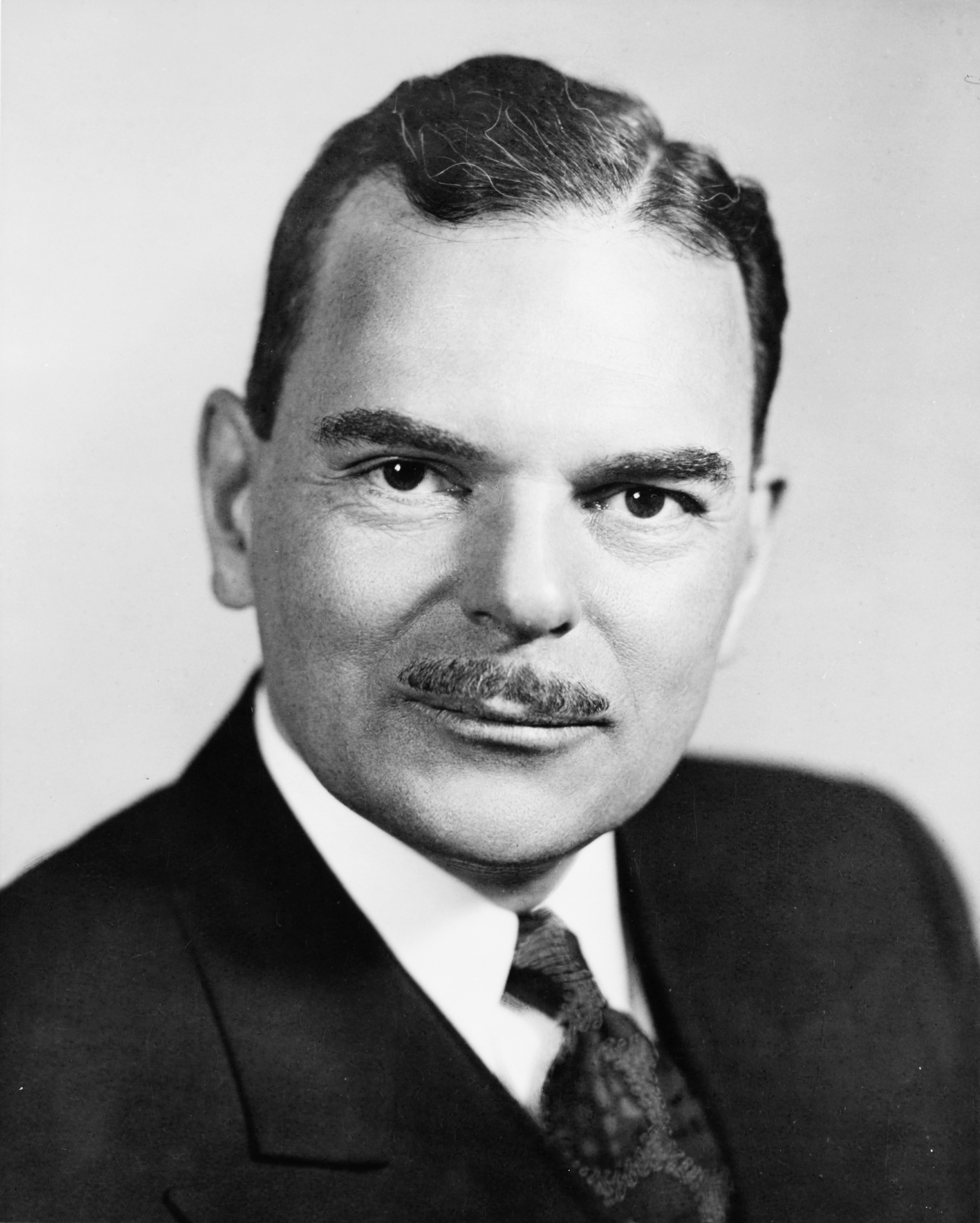
Thomas E. Dewey

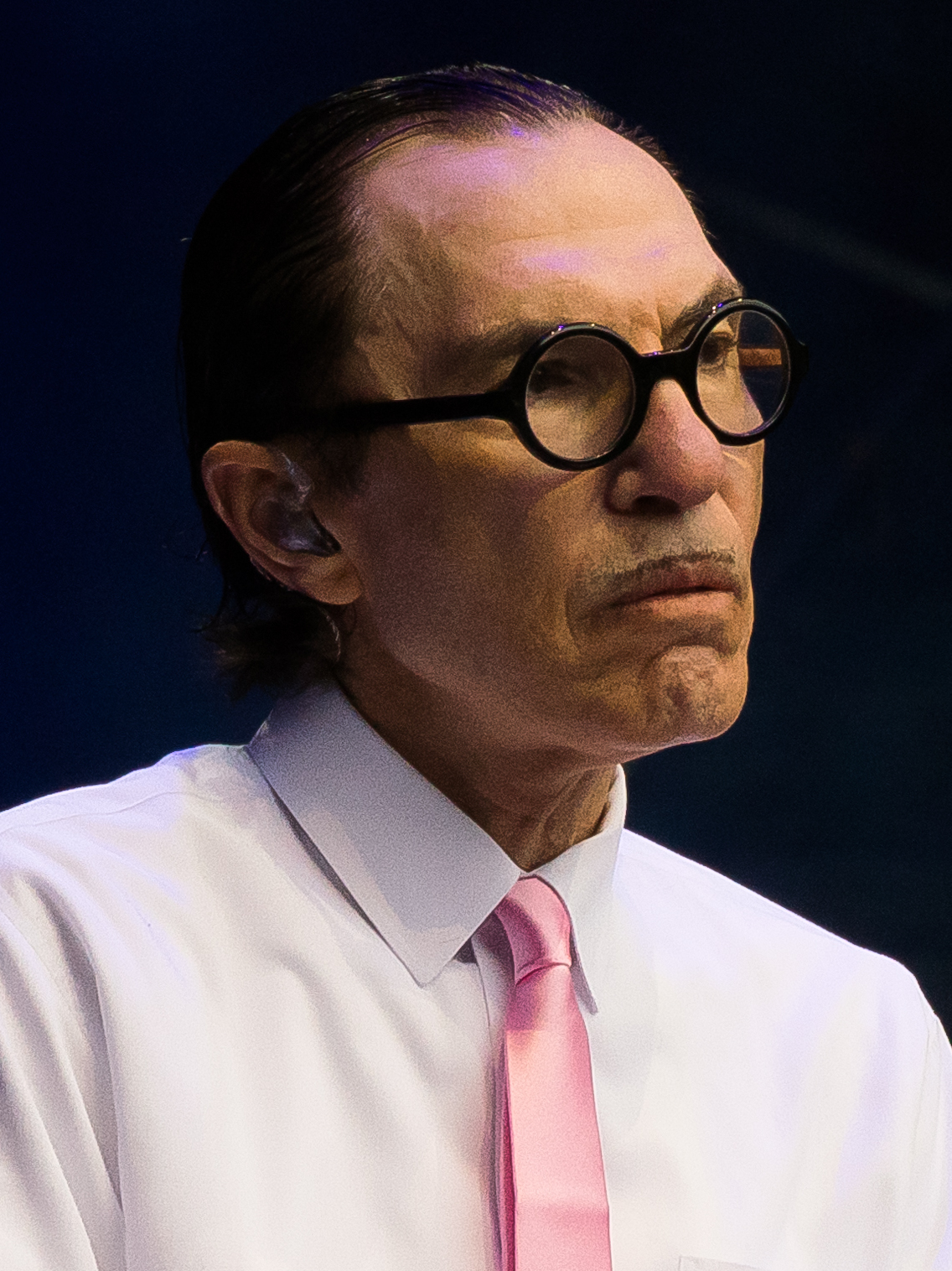
Ron Mael

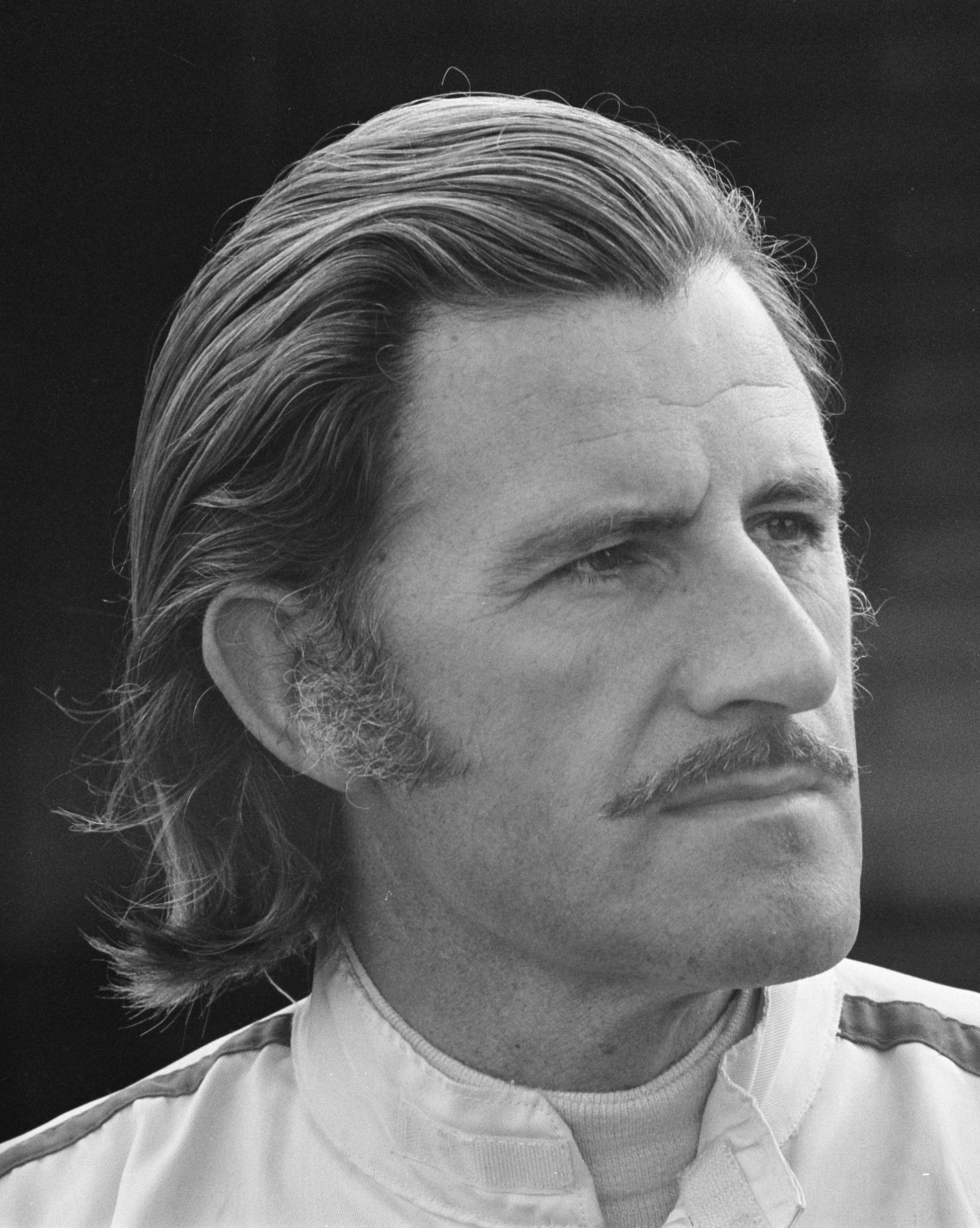
Graham Hill

== Popular culture ==
The actors John Gilbert, Bud Abbott, Errol Flynn, David Niven, Clark Gable, Don Ameche, J. K. Simmons and Leslie Phillips all had pencil moustaches. Musicians such as Little Richard, Sammy Davis Jr., Prince, George Benson, Midge Ure, Dave Wyndorf, Chris Cornell and Ron Mael have been associated with the look. Jimmy Buffett's 1974 song "Pencil Thin Mustache" is a nostalgic celebration of his childhood when such moustaches were more common.

== See also ==
- List of moustache styles
- List of facial hairstyles
