= Moustache =

Strip of facial hair across the upper lip

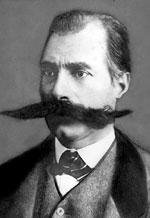
Panayot Hitov, Bulgarian revolutionary

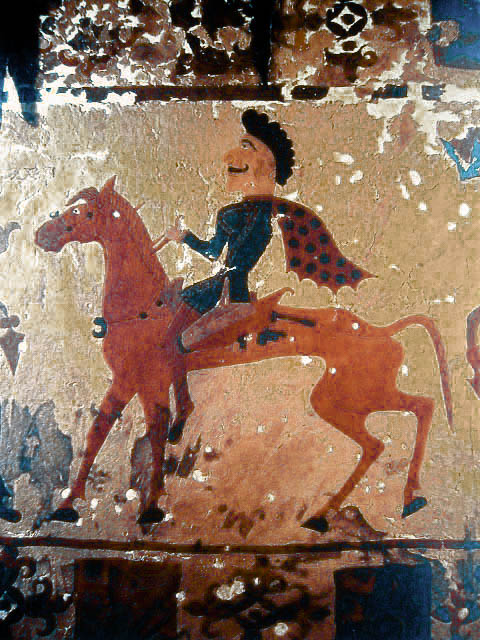
A moustachioed horseman on a c. 300 BC artwork found in Pazyryk burials

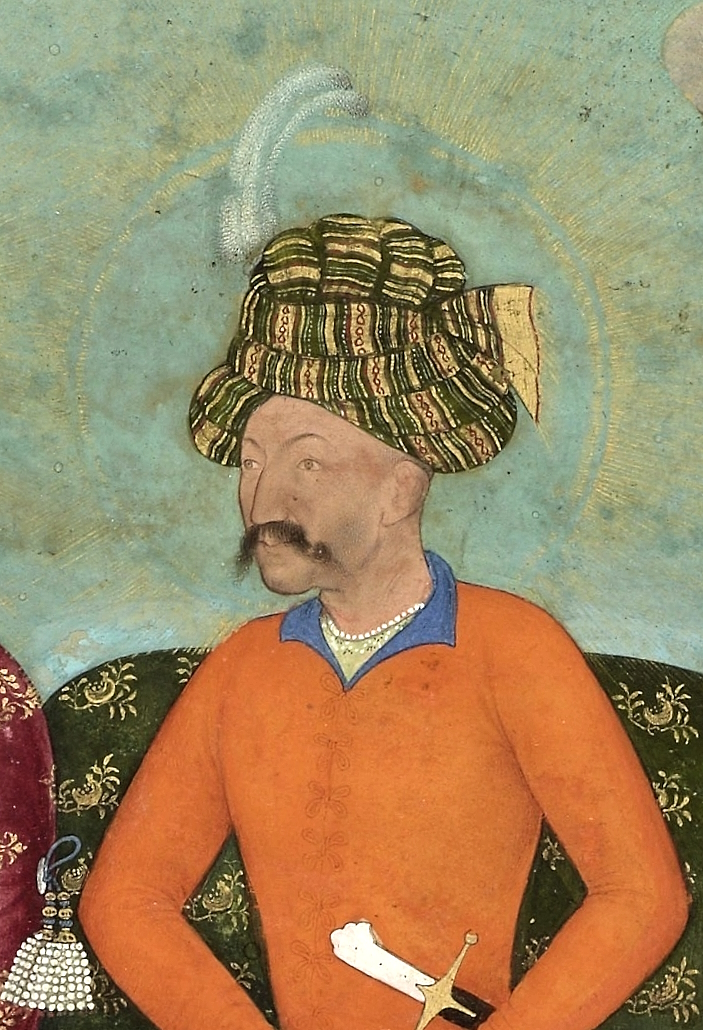
Abbas the Great, Shah of Persia

A moustache (UK: /məˈstɑːʃ/) or mustache (US: /ˈmʌstæʃ/) is a growth of facial hair grown above the upper lip and under the nose of people, mostly men.

Moustaches have been grown in various styles throughout history.

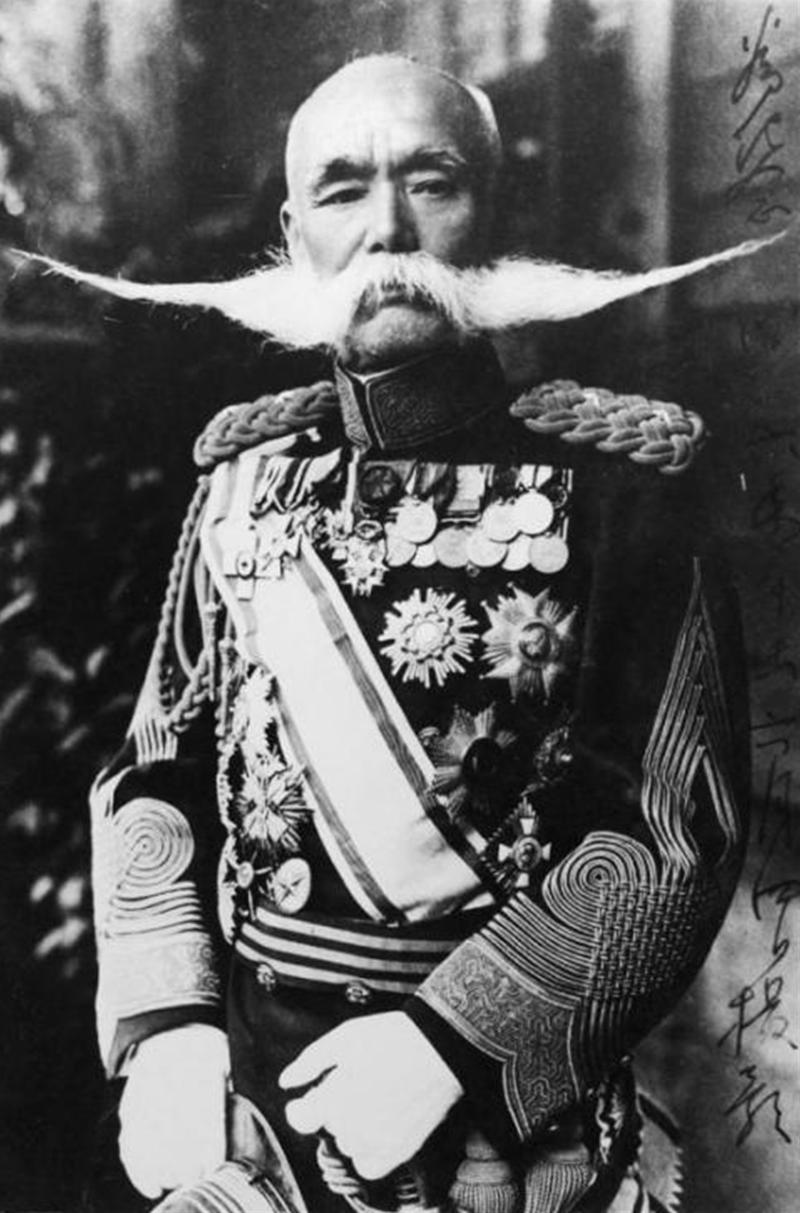
Count Gaishi Nagaoka, Japanese officer and Vice Chief of the General Staff in Japan during the Russo-Japanese War, with his exaggerated kaiser moustache

== Etymology ==
The word "moustache" is French, and is derived from the Italian mustacchio (14th century), dialectal mostaccio (16th century), from Medieval Latin mustacchium (eighth century), Medieval Greek μουστάκιον (moustakion), attested in the ninth century, which ultimately originates as a diminutive of Hellenistic Greek μύσταξ (mustax, mustak-), meaning "upper lip" or "facial hair", probably derived from Hellenistic Greek μύλλον (mullon), "lip".

An individual wearing a moustache is said to be "moustached" or "moustachioed" (the latter often referring to a particularly large or bushy moustache).

== History ==
Research done on this subject finds that the prevalence of moustaches and facial hair in general rise and fall in direct relation with the saturation of the marriage market. Thus, the density and thickness of the moustache or beard may help to convey androgen levels or age.

Earliest depictions of moustache trace back to Ancient Egypt old kingdom era (ca. 2649–2130 B.C.)

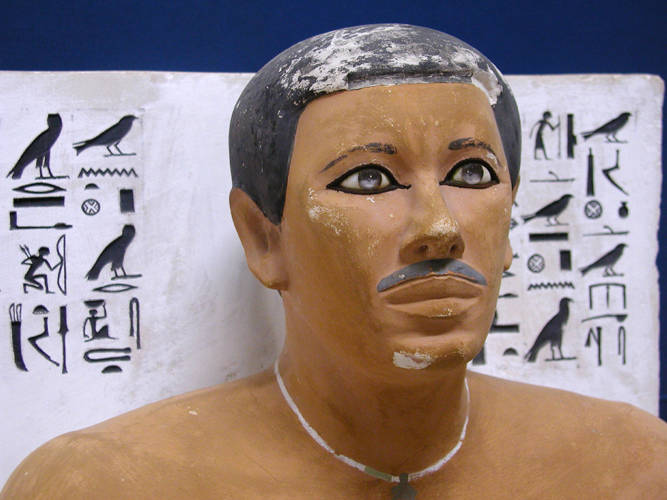
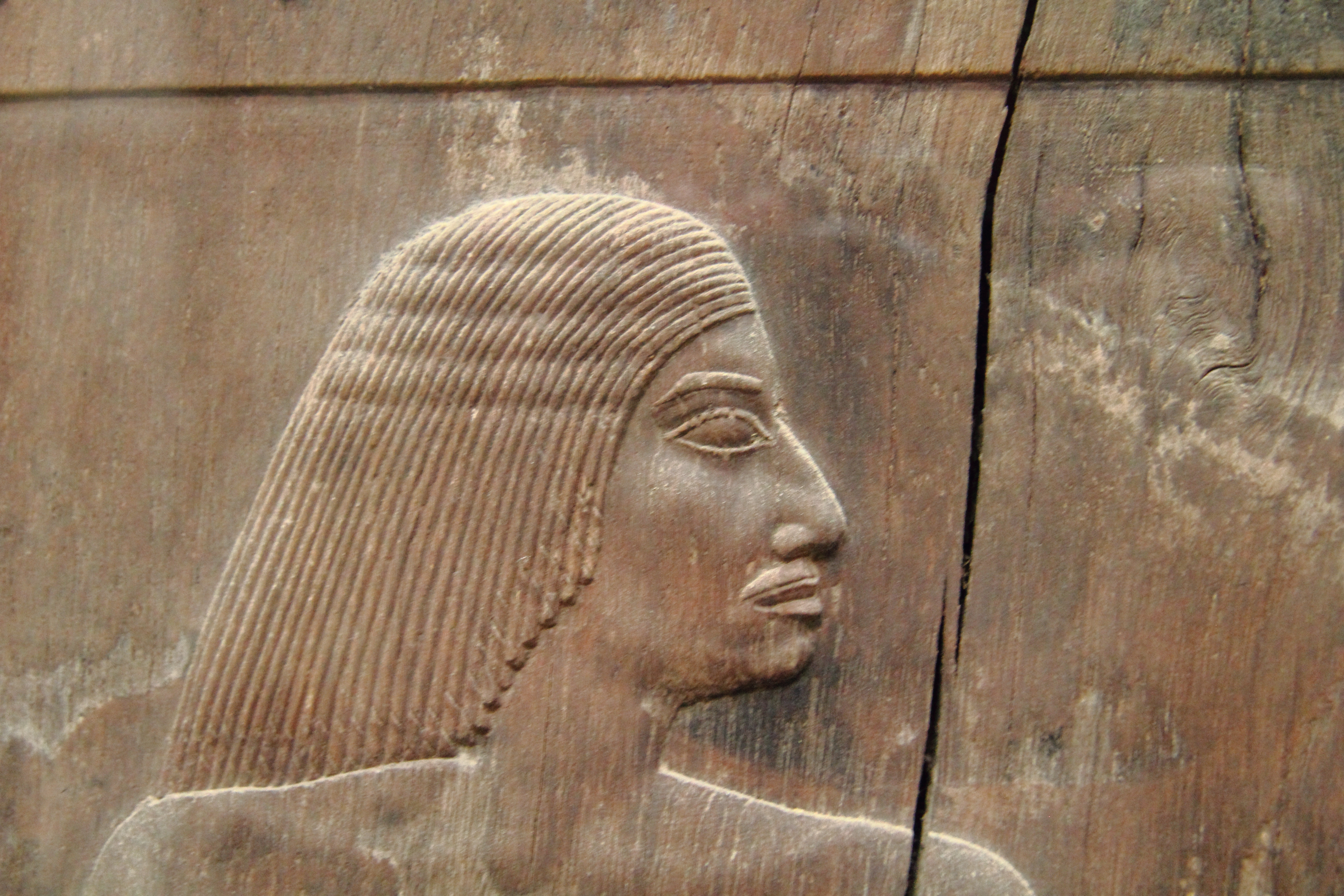
On the left: statue of prince Rahotep wearing a moustache, 27th century BC.
On the right: Hesy-Ra wearing a moustache, 27th century BC

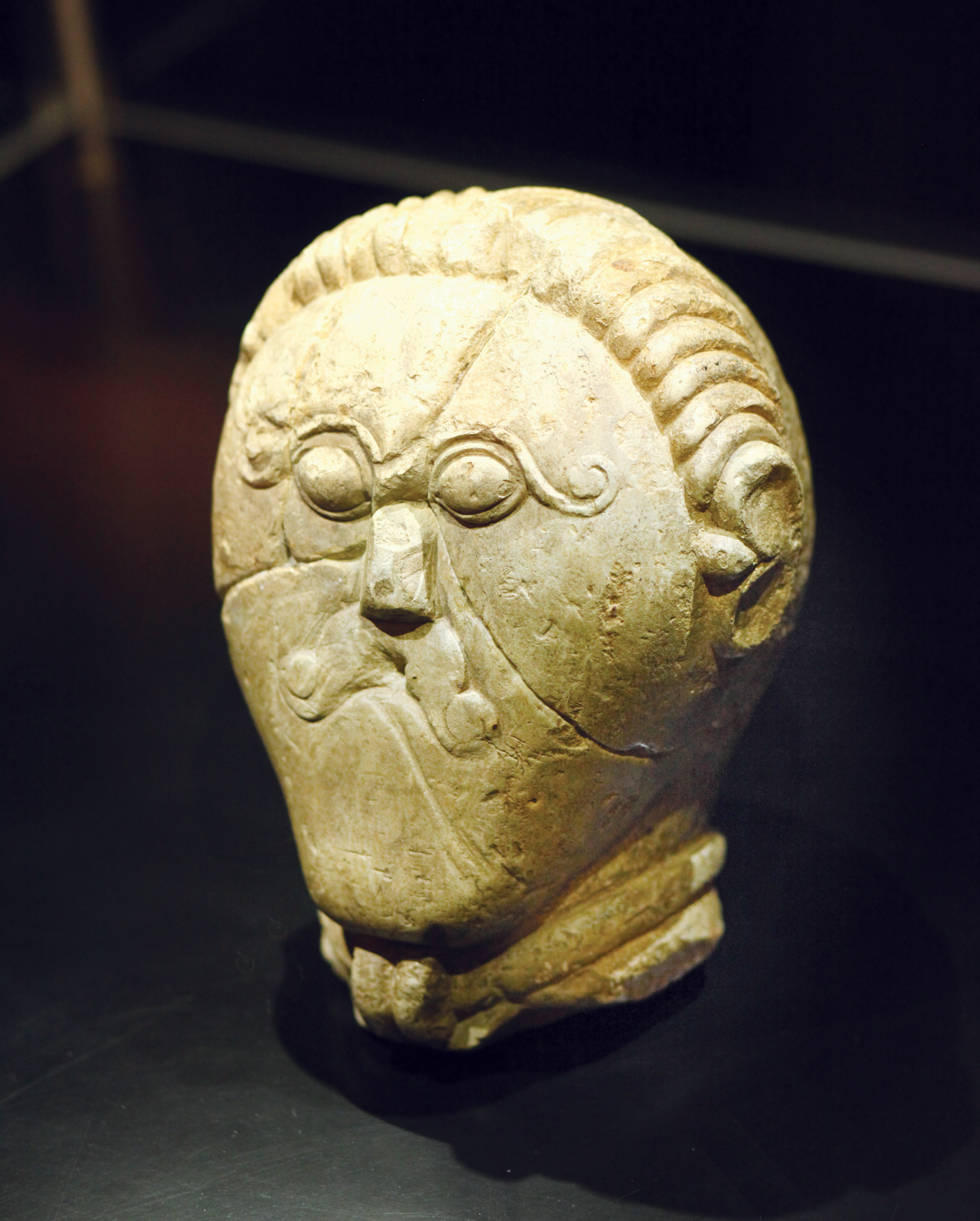
Stone sculpture of a Gaul wearing a torc, with curled moustache and eyebrows, c. 400 AD

One of the earliest documents of the usage of moustaches (without the beard) can be traced to Iron Age Celts. According to Diodorus Siculus, a Greek historian:

The Gauls are tall of body with rippling muscles and white of skin and their hair is blond, and not only naturally so for they also make it their practice by artificial means to increase the distinguishing colour which nature has given it. For they are always washing their hair in limewater and they pull it back from the forehead to the nape of the neck, with the result that their appearance is like that of Satyrs and Pans since the treatment of their hair makes it so heavy and coarse that it differs in no respect from the mane of horses. Some of them shave the beard but others let it grow a little; and the nobles shave their cheeks but they let the moustache grow until it covers the mouth.

Moustaches would not go away during the Middle Ages. One prominent example of the moustache in early medieval art is the Sutton Hoo helmet, an elaborately decorated helmet sporting a faceplate depicting the style on its upper lip. Later on, Welsh leaders and English royalty such as Edward of Wales would also often wear only a moustache.

Moustache popularity in the west peaked in the 1880s and 1890s coinciding with a popularity in the military virtues of the day.

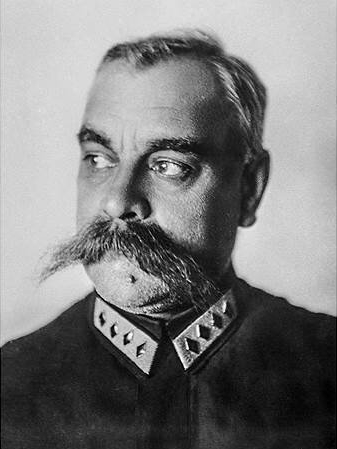
Sergey Sergeyevich Kamenev, Soviet military leader who reached Komandarm 1st rank and member of the Revolutionary Military Council of the USSR from April 1924 to May 1927.

Various cultures have developed different associations with moustaches. For example, in many 20th-century Arab countries, moustaches are associated with power, beards are associated with Islamic traditionalism, and clean-shaven or lack of facial hair are associated with more liberal, secular tendencies. In Islam, trimming the moustache is considered to be a sunnah and mustahabb, that is, a way of life that is recommended, especially among Sunni Muslims. The moustache is also a religious symbol for the male followers of the Yarsan religion.

Shaving with stone razors was technologically possible from as far back as the Neolithic times. A moustache is depicted on a statue of the 4th Dynasty Egyptian prince Rahotep (c. 2550 BC). Another ancient portrait showing a shaved man with a moustache is an ancient Iranian (Scythian) horseman from 300 BC.

In ancient China, facial hair and the hair on the head were traditionally left untouched because of Confucian influences.

== Development and care ==
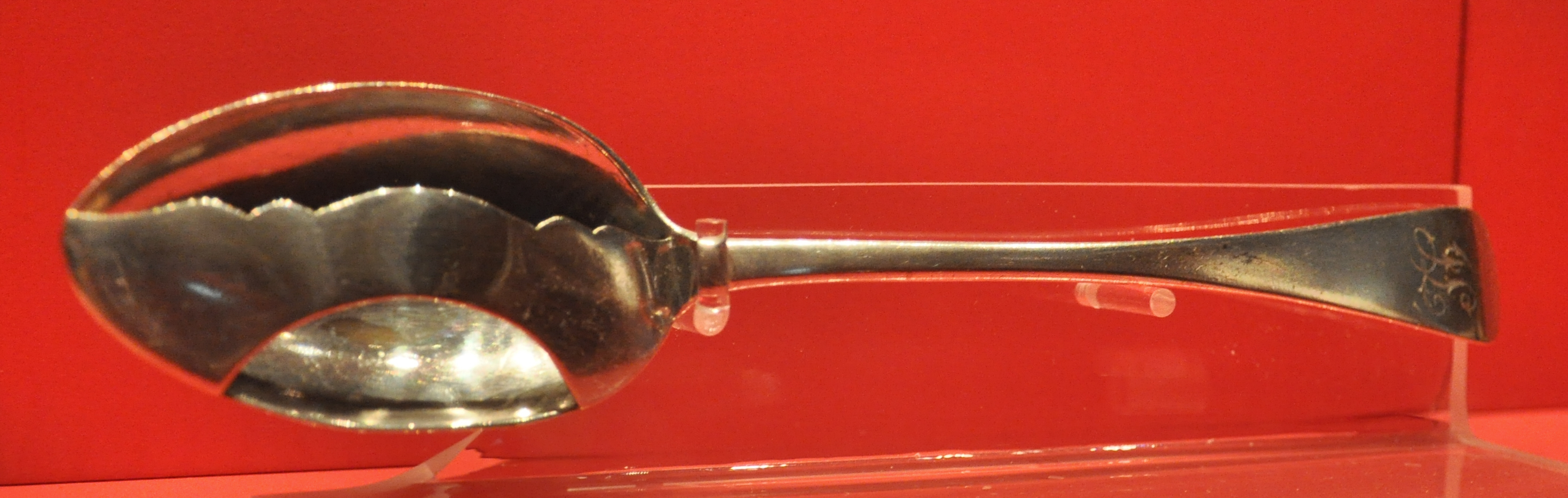
A moustache spoon, dated 1904, used in Edwardian England to protect the moustache while eating soup

The moustache forms its own stage in the development of facial hair in adolescent males.

As with most human biological processes, this specific order may vary among some individuals depending on one's genetic heritage or environment.

Moustaches can be tended through shaving the hair of the chin and cheeks, preventing it from becoming a full beard. A variety of tools have been developed for the care of moustaches, including safety razors, moustache wax, moustache nets, moustache brushes, moustache combs and moustache scissors.

In the Middle East, there is a growing trend for moustache transplants, which involves undergoing a procedure called follicular unit extraction in order to attain fuller and more impressive facial hair.

The longest moustache measures 4.29 metres (14.1 ft) and belongs to Ram Singh Chauhan from India. It was measured on the set of the Italian TV show Lo Show dei Record in Rome, Italy, on 4 March 2010.

== Styles ==
Time-lapse animation of a moustache grown for 30 days

The World Beard and Moustache Championships 2007 had six sub-categories for moustaches:

- Dalí – narrow, long points bent or curved steeply upward; areas past the corner of the mouth must be shaved. Artificial styling aids needed. Named after Salvador Dalí.
- English moustache – narrow, beginning at the middle of the upper lip the whiskers are very long and pulled to the side, slightly curled; the ends are pointed slightly upward; areas past the corner of the mouth usually shaved. Artificial styling may be needed.
- Freestyle – All moustaches that do not match other classes. The hairs are allowed to start growing from up to a maximum of 1.5 cm beyond the end of the upper lip. Aids are allowed.
- Hungarian – Big and bushy, beginning from the middle of the upper lip and pulled to the side. The hairs are allowed to start growing from up to a maximum of 1.5 cm beyond the end of the upper lip.
- Imperial – whiskers growing from both the upper lip and cheeks, curled upward (distinct from the royale, or impériale)
- Natural – Moustache may be styled without aids.

Other types of moustache include:

- Chevron – covering the area between the nose and the upper lip, out to the edges of the upper lip but no further. Popular in 1970s and 1980s American and British culture. Worn by Ron Jeremy, Richard Petty, Freddie Mercury, Bruce Forsyth and Tom Selleck.
- Fu Manchu – long, downward pointing ends, generally beyond the chin.
- Handlebar – bushy, with small upward pointing ends.
- Horseshoe – Often confused with the Handlebar Moustache, the horseshoe was possibly popularised by modern cowboys and consists of a full moustache with vertical extensions from the corners of the lips down to the jawline and resembling an upside-down horseshoe. Also known as "biker moustache". Worn by Hulk Hogan and Bill Kelliher. Recently re-popularised by Gardner Minshew and Joe Exotic.
- Pancho Villa – similar to the Fu Manchu but thicker; also known as a "droopy moustache". Also similar to the Horseshoe. A Pancho Villa is much longer and bushier than the moustache normally worn by the historical Pancho Villa.
- Pencil moustache – narrow, straight and thin as if drawn on by a pencil, closely clipped, outlining the upper lip, with a wide shaven gap between the nose and moustache. Popular in the 1940s, and particularly associated with Clark Gable. More recently, it has been recognised as the moustache of choice for the fictional character Gomez Addams in the 1990s series of films based on The Addams Family. Also known as a Mouth-brow, and worn by Vincent Price, John Waters, Little Richard, Sean Penn and Chris Cornell.
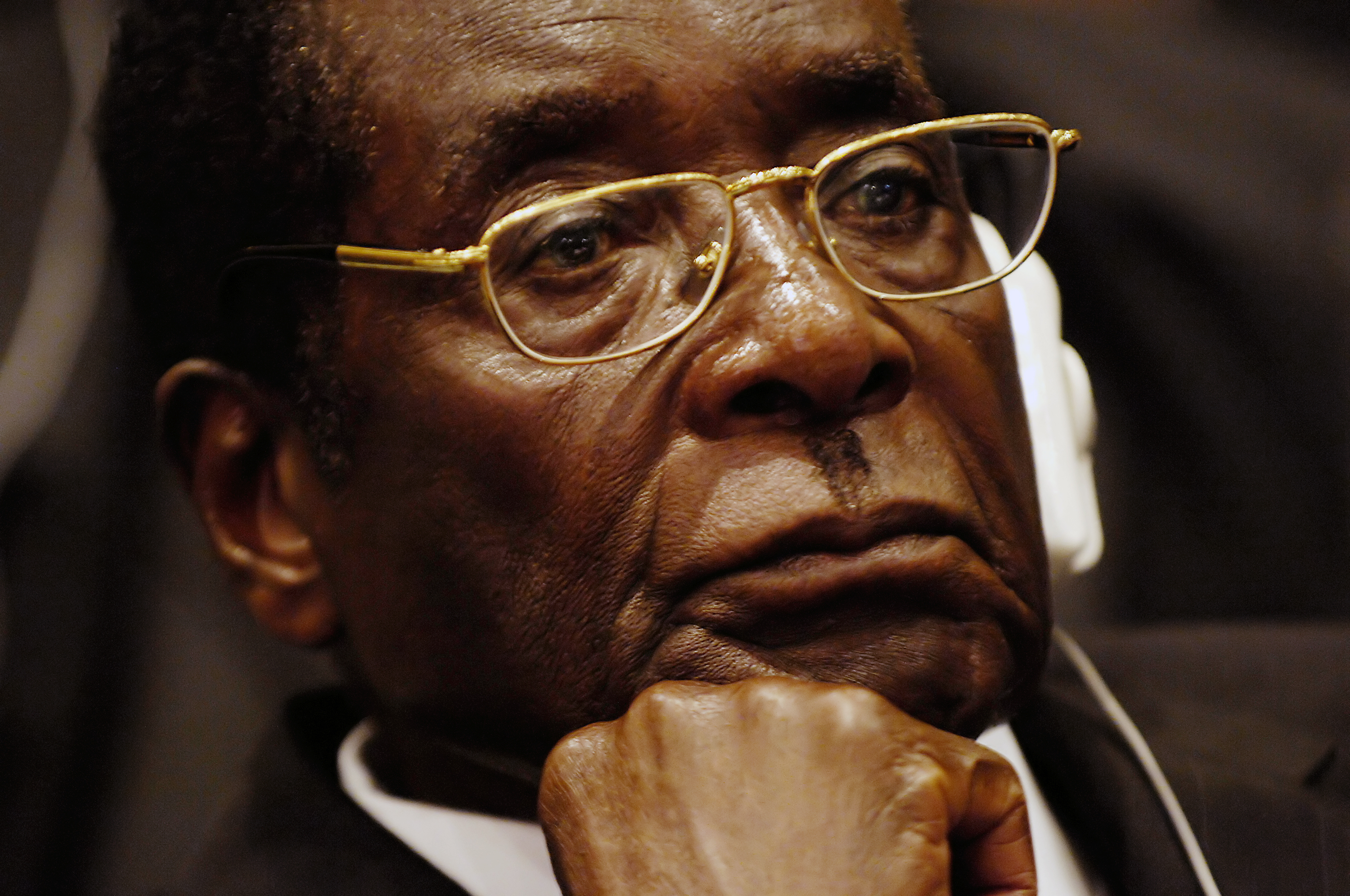
  Robert Mugabe, sporting an extremely thin variant of the toothbrush moustache that only covers his philtrum
- Toothbrush – thick, but shaved except for about an inch (2.5 cm) in the centre; worn by Charlie Chaplin (mainly in his Tramp character), Oliver Hardy, Ron Mael (before he switched to a pencil moustache in recent years), and Adolf Hitler, the latter of whom being responsible for the style becoming extremely unpopular, and remaining so for the nearly-century-long period extending to the present day.
- Walrus – bushy, hanging down over the lips, often entirely covering the mouth. Worn by Mark Twain, David Crosby, Joseph Stalin, John Bolton, Wilford Brimley, Friedrich Nietzsche, Jeff "Skunk" Baxter, Sam Elliott, Albert Einstein, Jamie Hyneman and Robert Johansson .
- Pornstache – A thick, heavy moustache with slightly elongated ends. The style originates among male pornographic actors in the 1970s and was most popular in the 1980s. The pornstache has been worn by celebrities such as Freddie Mercury, Lionel Richie, and Pedro Pascal.
Moustache styles

"Dalí" moustache style

"English" moustache style

"Fu Manchu" moustache style

"Handlebar" moustache style

"Horseshoe" moustache style

"Imperial " moustache style

"Mexican" moustache style

"Natural " moustache style

"Pencil" moustache style

"Toothbrush" moustache style

"Walrus" moustache style

"Freestyle" moustache style

== Occurrence and perceptions ==
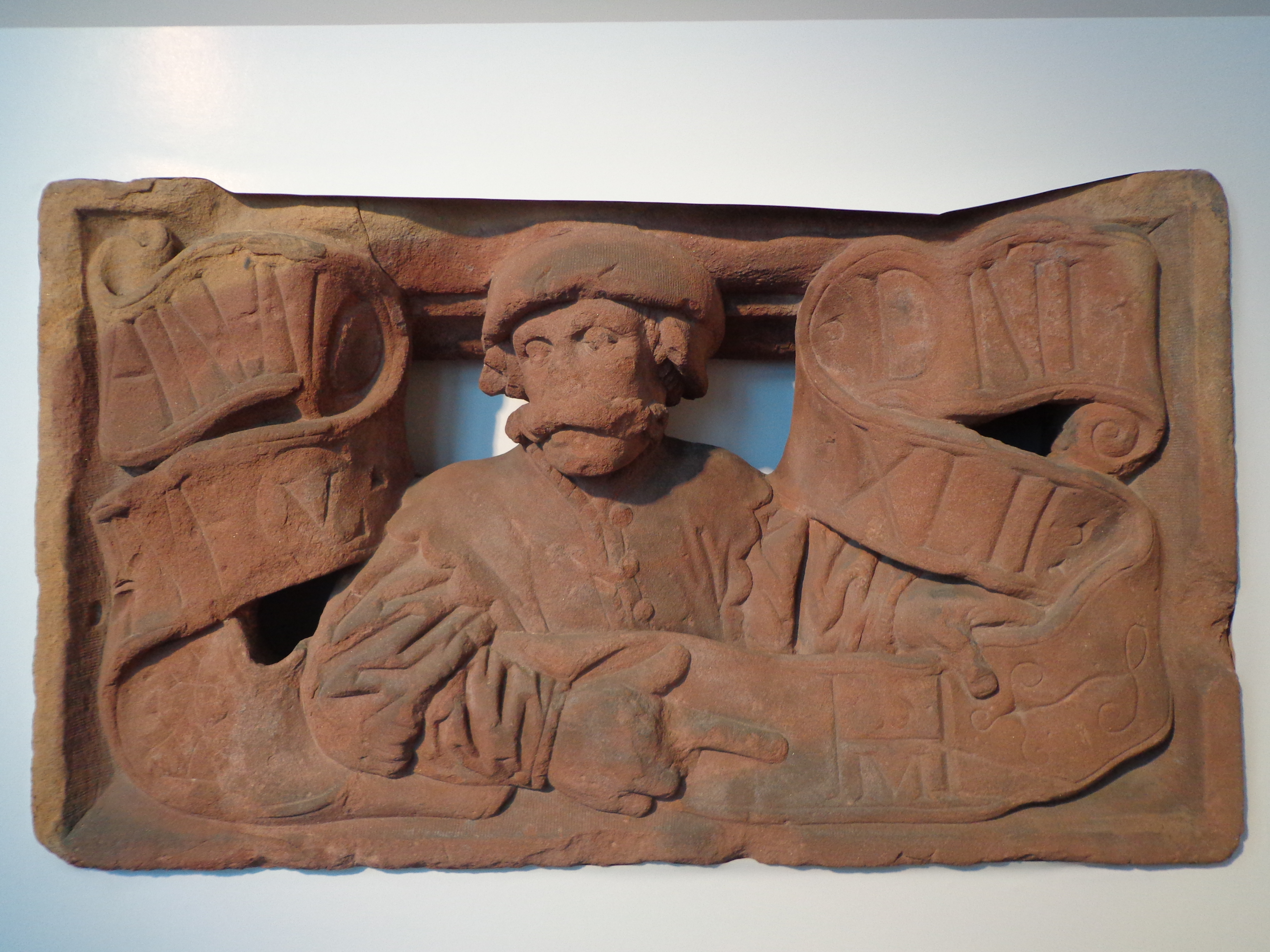
Self-portrait of sculptor Friedrich Hammer, 1542 (Musée historique de Haguenau)

Like many other fashion trends, the moustache is subject to shifting popularity through time. Though modern culture often associates moustaches with men of the Victorian era, Susan Walton shows that at the start of the Victorian era facial hair was "viewed with distaste" and that the moustache was considered the mark of an artist or revolutionary, both of which remained on the social fringe at the time. This is supported by the fact that only one Member of Parliament sported facial hair from the years 1841–1847. However, by the 1860s, this had changed and moustaches became wildly popular, even among distinguished men, but by the end of the century, facial hair became passé once more. Though one cannot be entirely sure as to the cause of such changes, Walton speculates that the rise of the facial hair trend was due largely in part to the impending war against Russia, and the belief that moustaches and beards projected a more 'manly' image, which was brought about by the so-called 'rebranding' of the British military and the rehabilitation of military virtues. Moustaches became a defining trait of the British soldier, and until 1916, no enlisted soldier was permitted to shave his upper lip. However, the next generation of men perceived facial hair, such as moustaches, to be an outdated emblem of masculinity and therefore there was a dramatic decline in the moustache trend and a clean-shaven face became the mark of a modern man.

=== Marriage ===
According to a study performed by Nigel Barber, results have shown a strong correlation between a good marriage market for women and an increased number of moustaches worn by the male population. By comparing the number of males pictured in Illustrated London News sporting a moustache against the ratio of single women to single men, the similar trends in the two over the years would suggest that these two factors are correlated. Barber suggests that this correlation may be due to the fact that men with moustaches are perceived to be more attractive, industrious, creative, masculine, dominant and mature by both men and women, as supported by the research conducted by Hellström and Tekle. Barber suggests that these perceived traits would influence a woman's choice of husband as they would suggest likely high reproductive success and other good biological qualities, and a capacity to invest in children, so when males must compete heavily for marriage they are more likely to grow a moustache in an attempt to project these qualities. This theory is also supported by the correlation between beard fashion and women wearing long dresses, as shown by Robinson's study, which then relates to the correlation between dress fashion and the marriage market, as shown in Barber's 1999 study.

=== Age perception ===
The moustache and other forms of facial hair are globally understood to be signs of the post-pubescent male; however, those with moustaches are perceived to be older than those who are clean-shaven of the same age. This was determined by manipulating a photo of six male subjects, with varying levels of baldness, to have moustaches and beards and then asking undergraduate college students to rate both the photos of the men with facial hair and without facial hair in terms of social maturity, aggression, age, appeasement, and attractiveness. Regardless of how bald the subject was, the results found in relation to the perception of moustaches remained constant. Although males with facial hair were perceived, in general, to be older than the same subject pictured without facial hair, the moustached subjects were also perceived to be far less socially mature. The decreased perception of social maturity of the men with moustaches may partially be due to the increase in the perception of aggression in the moustachioed men, as aggression is incompatible with social maturity.

=== Workplace ===
In a study performed by J. A. Reed and E. M. Blunk, persons in management positions were shown to positively perceive, and therefore be more likely to hire, men with facial hair. Although men with beards overall scored better than men with only moustaches, the moustached men scored much higher than those men who were clean-shaven. In this experiment, 228 people, both male and female, who held management positions that made hiring decisions were shown ink sketches of six male job applicants. The men in these ink sketches ranged from clean-shaven, to moustachioed, to bearded. The men with facial hair were rated higher by the employers on aspects of masculinity, maturity, physical attractiveness, dominance, self-confidence, nonconformity, courage, industriousness, enthusiasm, intelligence, sincerity, and general competency. The results were found to be fairly similar for both female and male employers, which Reed and Blunk suggest would imply that gender does not factor into one's perceptions of a moustache on a male applicant. However, Blunk and Reed also stipulate that the meaning and acceptability of facial hair does change depending on the time period. However, again, the studies performed by Hellström and Tekle and also the studies performed by Klapprott would suggest that moustaches are not favourable to all professions as it has been shown that clean-shaven men are seen as more reliable in roles such as salesmen and professors. Other studies have suggested that acceptability of facial hair may vary depending on culture and location, as in a study conducted in Brazil, clean-shaven men were preferred by personnel managers over applicants who were bearded, goateed, or moustached.

=== Cultures ===
In Western culture, it has been shown that women dislike men who displayed a visible moustache or beard, but preferred men who had a visible hint of a beard such as stubble (often known as a five o'clock shadow) over those who were clean-shaven. This supports the idea that in Western culture, females prefer men who have the capability to cultivate facial hair, such as a moustache, but choose not to. However some researchers have suggested that it is possible that in ecologies in which physical aggressiveness is more adaptive than cooperation, bearded men might be preferred by women. However, varying opinion on moustaches is not reserved to international cultural differences as even within the US, there have been discrepancies observed on female preference of male facial hair. Freedman's study suggested that women studying at the University of Chicago preferred men with facial hair because they perceived them to be more masculine, sophisticated and mature than clean-shaven men. Similarly, a study performed by Kenny and Fletcher at Memphis State University suggested that men with facial hair, such as moustaches and beards, were perceived as stronger and more masculine by female students. However, the study performed by Feinman and Gill would suggest that this reaction to facial hair is not nationwide, as women studying in the state of Wyoming showed a marked preference for clean-shaven men over men with facial hair. Some accredit this difference to the difference between region, rurality, and political and social conservatism between the various studies. Thus it can be seen that even within the US, there are slight variations in the perceptions of moustaches.

=== Religions ===
In addition to various cultures, the perception of the moustache is also altered by religion as some religions support the growth of a moustache or facial hair in general, whereas others tend to reject those with moustaches, while many churches remain somewhat ambivalent on the subject.

==== Amish ====
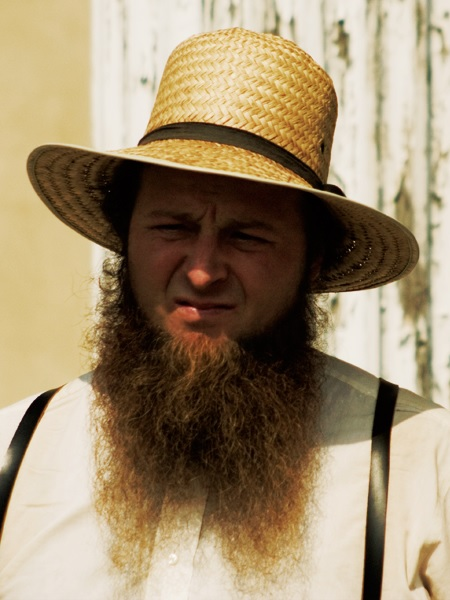
Amish man

While Amish men grow beards after marriage and never trim them, they eschew moustaches and continue shaving their upper lips. This is rooted in a rejection of the German military fashion of sporting moustaches, which was prevalent at the time of the Amish community's formation in Switzerland; hence serving as a symbol of their commitment to pacifism.

==== The Church of Jesus Christ of Latter-day Saints ====
Though it is never explicitly stated by the Church of Jesus Christ of Latter-day Saints that all male members must be clean-shaven, within Latter-day Saint circles it is often considered "taboo" for men to have moustaches as the missionaries of the church are required to be clean-shaven as well as the honour code of Brigham Young University requiring students to have similar grooming standards. This has become somewhat of a social norm within the church itself. This often leads those members who do choose to wear moustaches feel somewhat like they do not quite fit the norm, and yet in the studies shown done by Nielsen and White, these men reportedly do not mind this feeling and that is why they continue to grow their facial hair.

==== Islam ====
Even though facial grooming is not specifically mentioned within the Qur'an, numerous narrations of hadith (reported sayings of Muhammad) address personal hygiene, including facial hair maintenance. In one such example, Muhammad advised that men must grow beards, and as to moustaches, cut the longer hairs as to not let them cover the upper lips (as this is the Fitra, the tradition of prophets). Thus, growing a beard while keeping the moustache from covering the upper lip is a well-established tradition in many Muslim societies.

== Notable moustaches ==
=== Individuals ===
The longest moustache measures 4.29 metres (14.1 ft) and belongs to Ram Singh Chauhan of India. It was measured on the set of Lo Show dei Record in Rome, Italy, on 4 March 2010.

In some cases, the moustache is so prominently identified with a single individual that it could identify him without any further identifying traits. For example, Kaiser Wilhelm II's moustache, grossly exaggerated, featured prominently in Triple Entente propaganda. Other notable individuals include: Adolf Hitler, Joseph Stalin, Saddam Hussein, Hulk Hogan, Freddie Mercury, Salvador Dalí, Theodore Roosevelt, Frank Zappa, Sam Elliott, Tom Selleck, Burt Reynolds, and Steve Harvey. In other cases, such as those of Charlie Chaplin and Groucho Marx, the moustache in question was artificial for most of the wearer's life.

Following a moped accident that left him with a scar on his upper lip, Paul McCartney decided to grow a moustache in order to hide it. The other members of the Beatles decided to do the same. They were first seen with this new look on the cover of their 1967 album Sgt. Pepper's Lonely Hearts Club Band. This marked the return of young men wearing moustaches in the 1960s.

=== In art, entertainment, and media ===
==== Alias ====
- Moustache was the alias name of a French comic actor, François-Alexandre Galipedes (b. 14 February 1929 in Paris, France – d. 25 March 1987 in Arpajon, Essonne, France), known for his roles in Paris Blues (1961), How to Steal a Million (1966), and Zorro (1975)

==== Fictional characters ====
- Moustaches have long been used by artists to make characters distinctive, as with Charlie Chan, Mario, Revolver Ocelot, Daniel Plainview, Omni-Man, Mike Haggar, Tony Stark, Doctor Strange, King Bradley, Ned Flanders, Ron Swanson, Saxton Hale, Hercule Poirot, Ted Lasso, The Lorax, Yosemite Sam or Snidely Whiplash.
- The Bollywood film Sharaabi had a character Natthulal whose moustache became a legend. Munchhen hon to Natthulal jaisi, warna na hon (Moustaches should be like Nathulal's or should not be at all) became one of the most quoted pieces of dialogue from the film.
- At least one fictional moustache has been so notable that a whole style has been named after it: the Fu Manchu moustache.
- In the children's series In the Night Garden..., Mr. Pontipine has an oversized fake moustache, which covers up his mouth. In the episode titled "Mr. Pontipine's Moustache Flies Away", his fake moustache flies off, but he retrieves it later.

==== Literature ====
- In 1954, Salvador Dalí published a book dedicated solely to his moustache.

==== Visual art ====
They have also been used to make a social or political point as with:

- Marcel Duchamp's L.H.O.O.Q. (1919), a parody of the Mona Lisa which adds a goatee and moustache
- Frida Kahlo's moustachioed self-portraits

==== Music ====
- In 2014, France was represented at the Eurovision Song Contest by the song "Moustache", performed by French band Twin Twin. The song was described as "an irresistible dance track that tells the story of a man who already has everything, but who still wants a moustache, a humorous and affectionate critique of our culture of hyper-consumption".

=== In the military ===
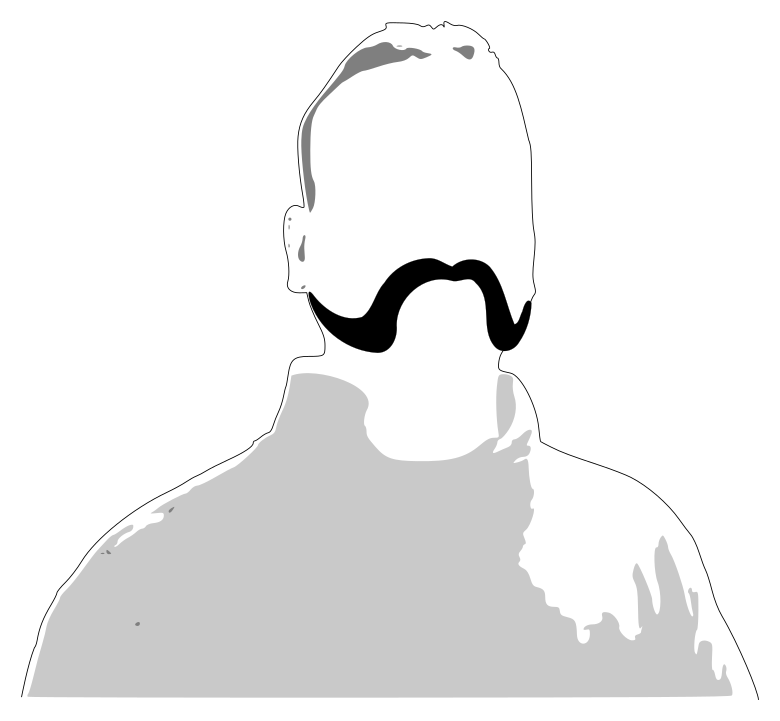
Abhinandan moustache, named after Abhinandan Varthaman, wing-commander in the Indian Air Force, during the 2019 India-Pakistan standoff; the style is similar to a combination of an old, horseshoe-style gunslinger moustache and mutton chops worn by Franz Joseph I of Austria.

- In the Indian Army, most senior rifle Rajputana regiment soldiers have moustaches, and the Rajputana Moustache is a symbol of dignity, caste status, and the spirit of Rajput soldiers.
- Moustaches are also noted among US Army armour and cavalry soldiers.
- Moustaches were a compulsory part of the British Army uniform until 1916, and were quite often worn by soldiers later in the Falklands Campaign.

=== In sport ===
- Swimmer Mark Spitz grew a moustache for the 1972 Summer Olympic Games, winning seven gold medals. When asked why he initially grew one, he stated, "I grew the moustache because a coach in college said I couldn't grow one." It took four months to grow.
- Notable football players with moustaches include David Seaman, Graeme Souness, Toni Schumacher, Frank Worthington, John Wark, Rudi Voller, Ian Rush and Ruud Gullit.
- In the early-1970s, Major League Baseball players seldom wore facial hair. As detailed in the book Mustache Gang, Oakland Athletics owner Charlie Finley decided to hold a moustache-growing contest within his team. When the A's faced the Cincinnati Reds, whose team rules forbade facial hair, in the 1972 World Series, the series was dubbed by media as "the hairs vs. the squares".
- For the 2008 Summer Olympic Games in Beijing, the Croatia men's national water polo team grew moustaches in honour of coach Ratko Rudić.
- During the 2012 Summer Olympic Games in London Chileans supporters painted moustaches on their skin as a sign of support of gymnast Tomás González.
- NHL player George Parros was so well known for his moustache that replicas were sold by his team, with proceeds going to charity.
- Formula 1 driver Nigel Mansell wore a famous chevron moustache during his racing career. Although he shaved it off twice, once during the 1988 season, and again after his retirement, he did later grow it back.
- NASCAR drivers Richard Petty and Dale Earnhardt were well known for their moustaches.

== Gallery ==
Moustache examples
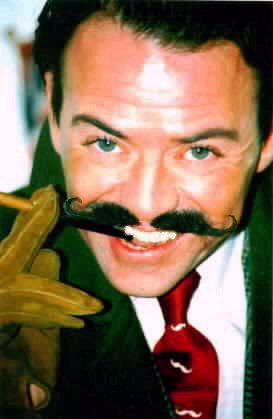
Satirist Michael "Atters" Attree sporting his Handlebar Club tie

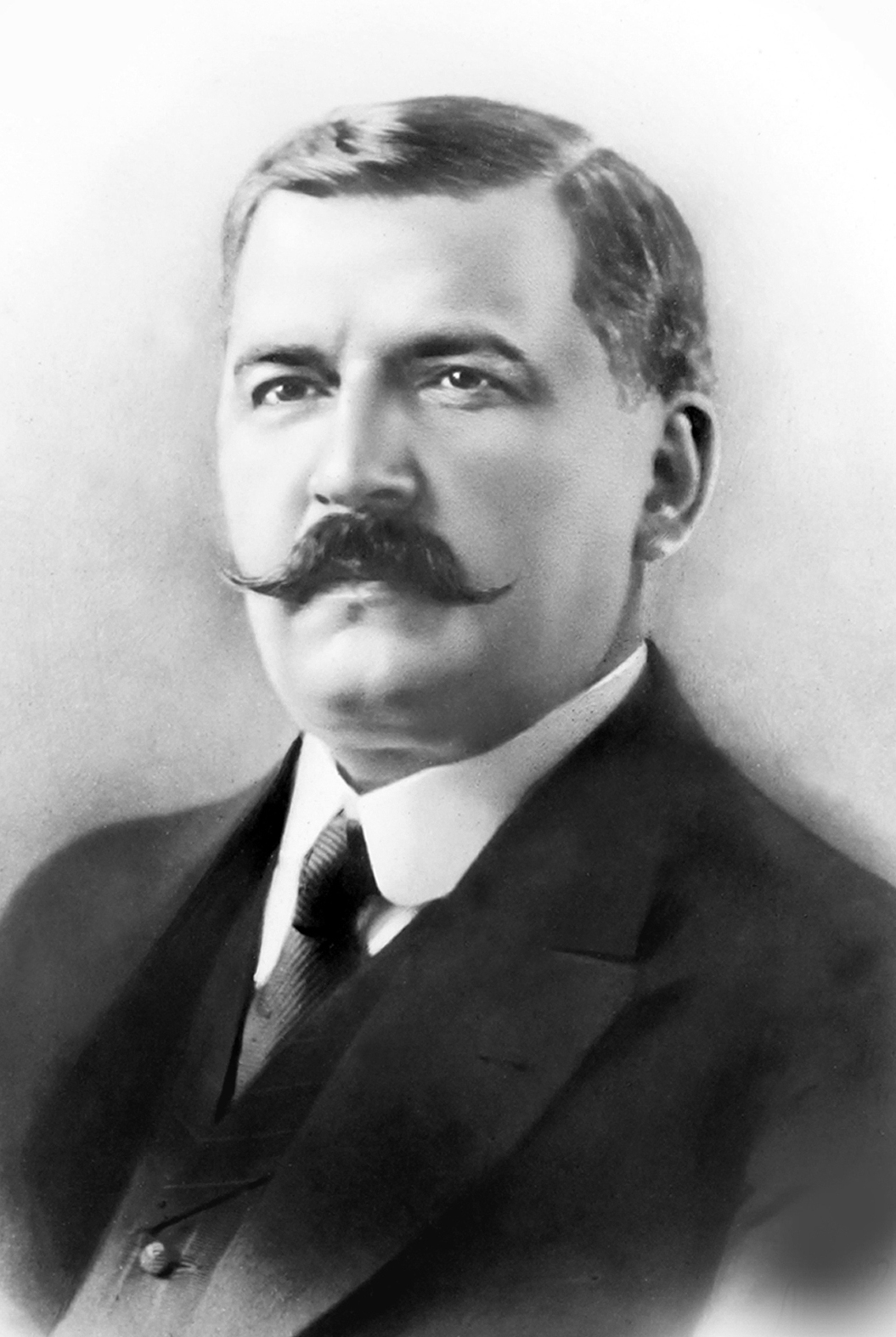
Venceslau Brás, President of Brazil, with a handlebar or imperial moustache

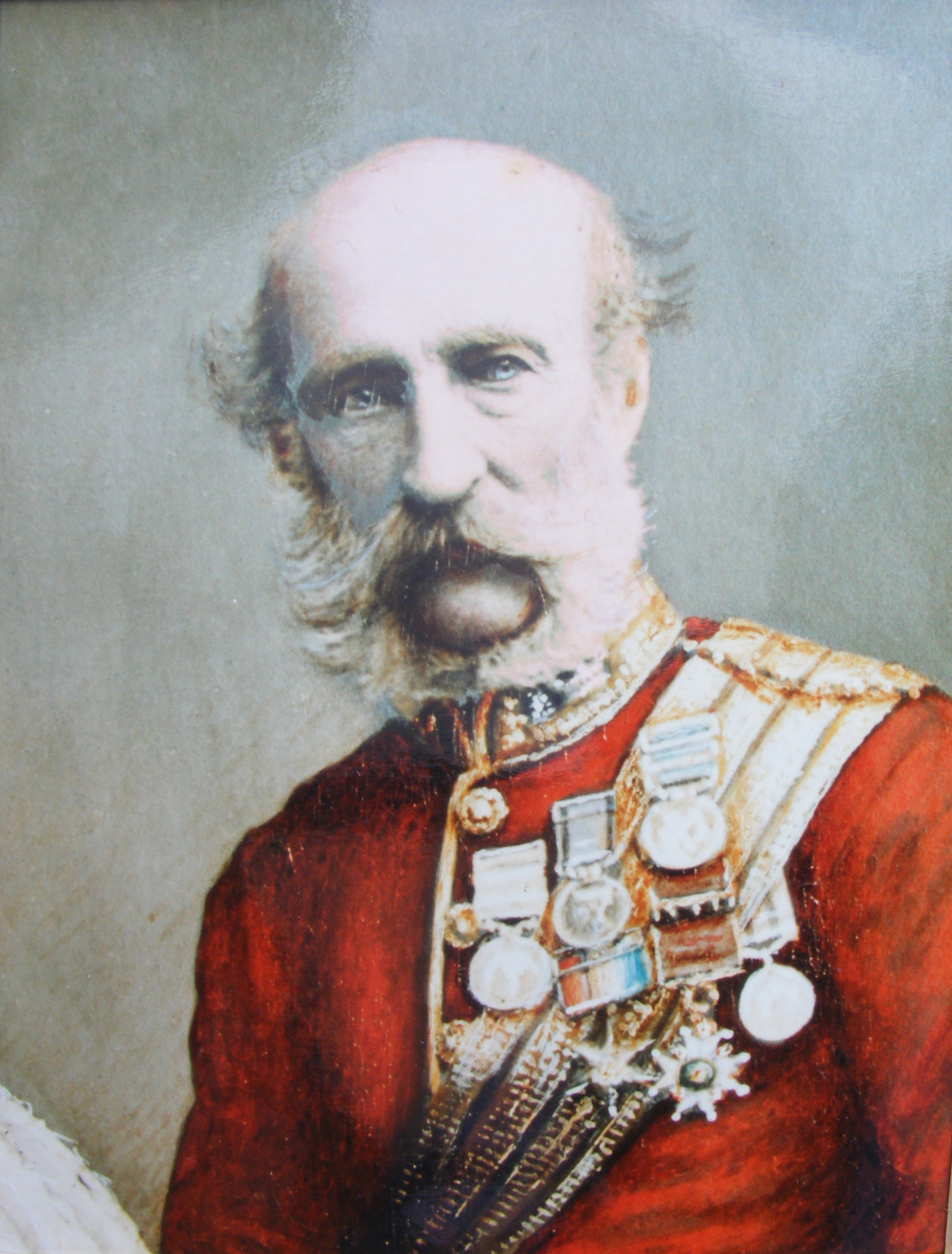
General George Campbell of Inverneill with an imperial moustache

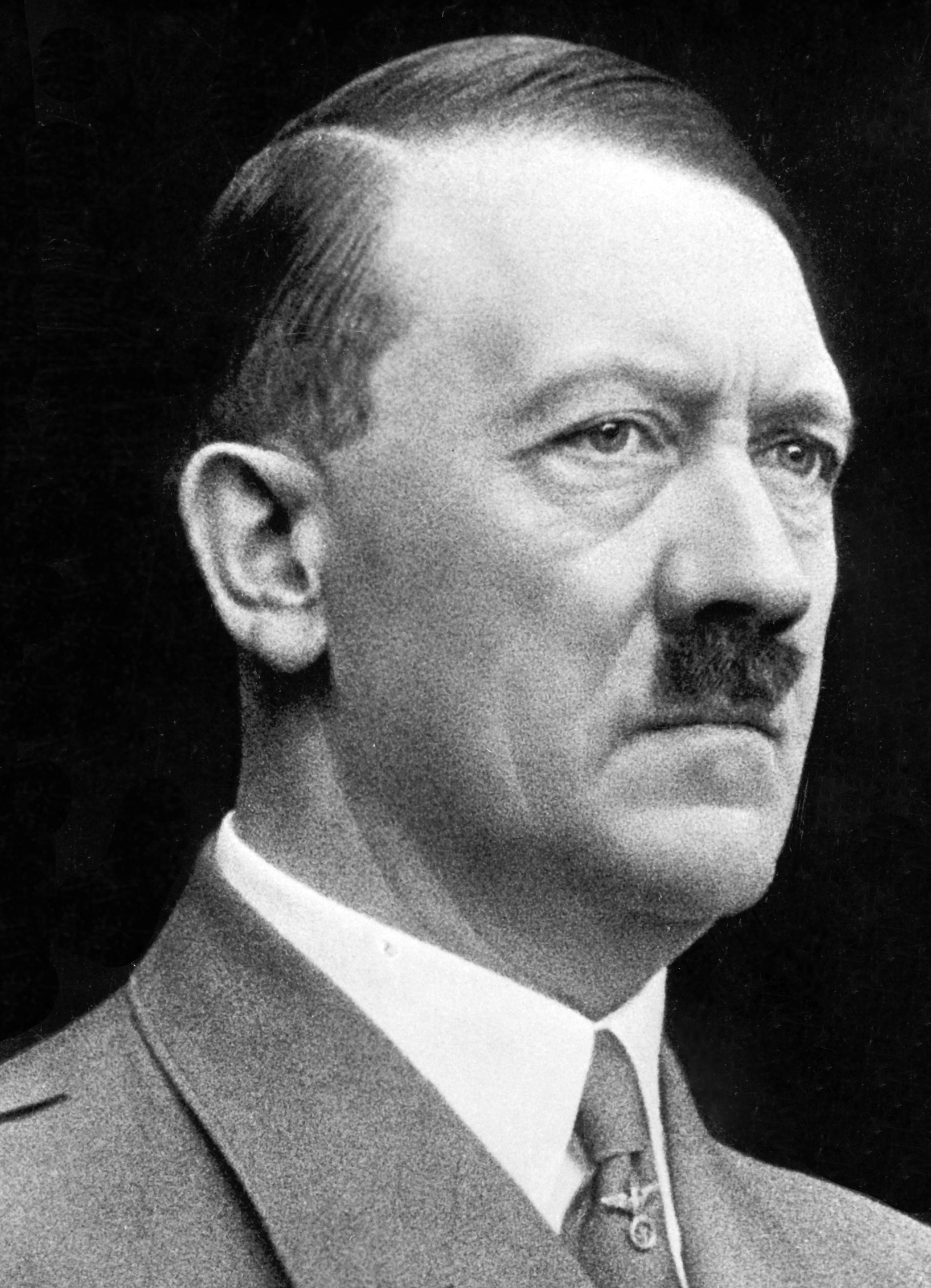
Adolf Hitler with a toothbrush moustache

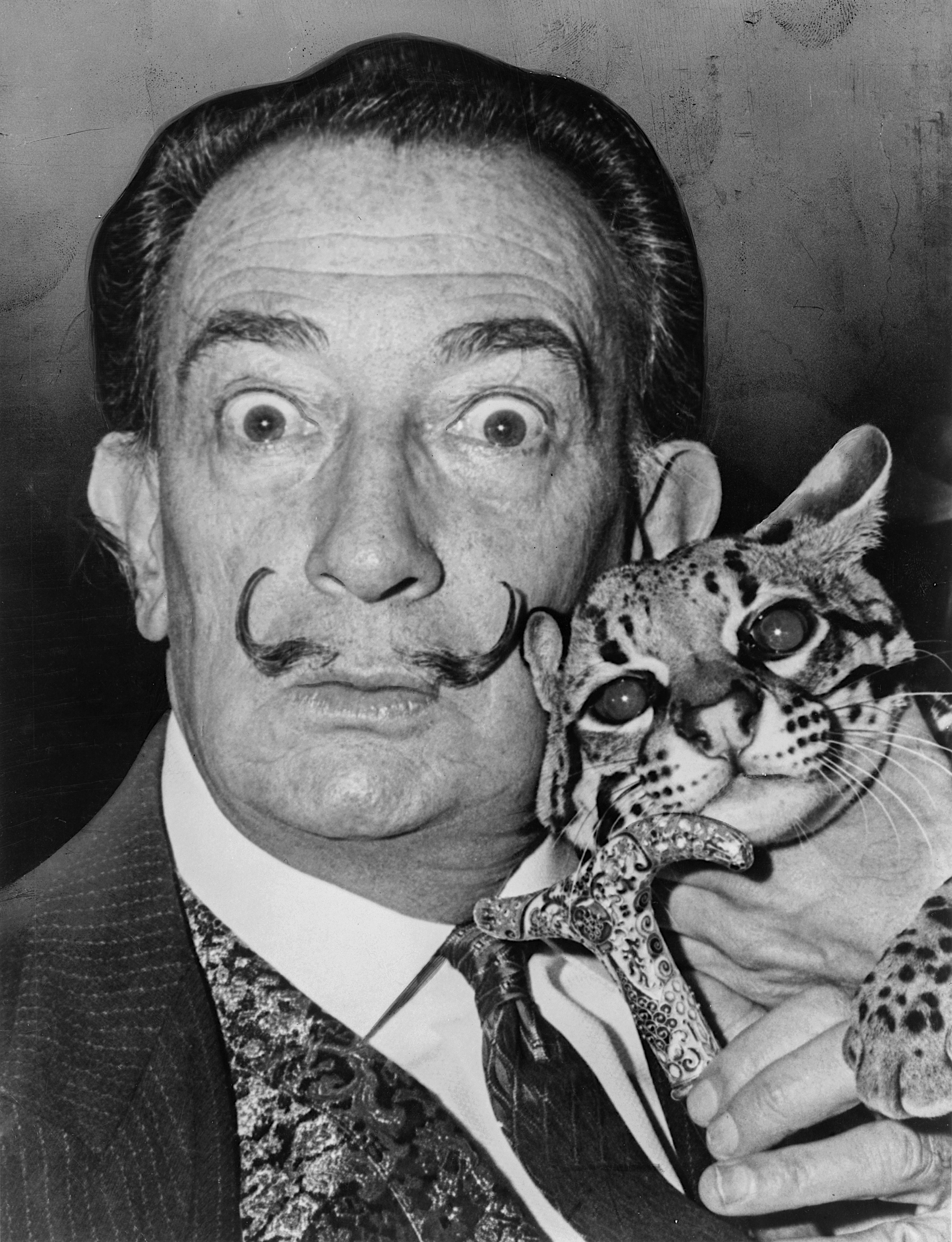
Surrealist Salvador Dalí with the flamboyant moustache he popularised

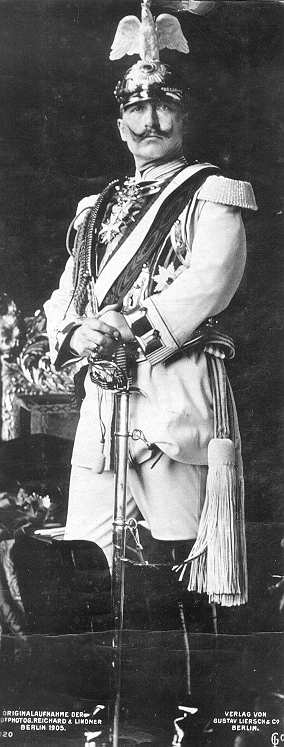
Lavishly bemedalled Kaiser Wilhelm II with his distinctive upswept moustache

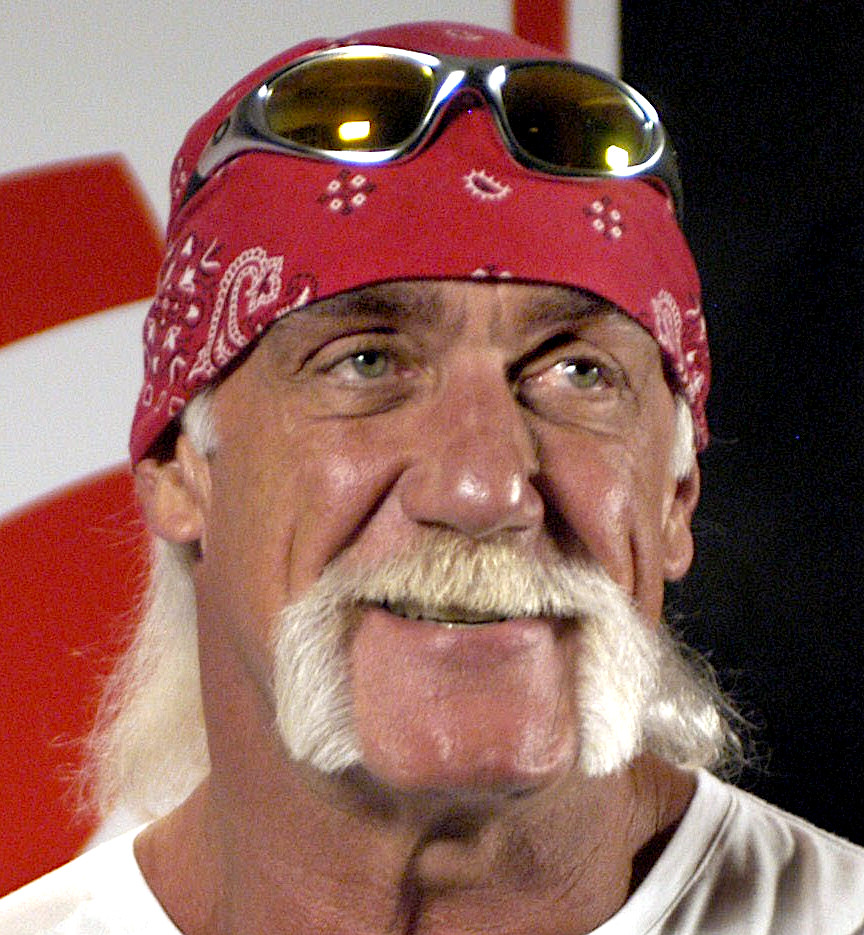
Hulk Hogan with a horseshoe moustache

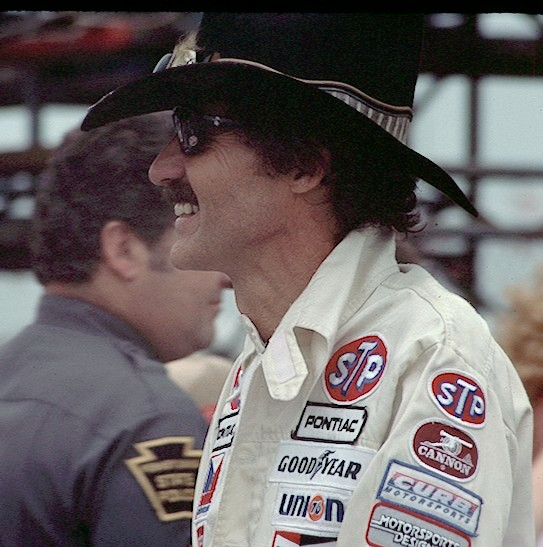
Richard Petty with a chevron moustache (side view)

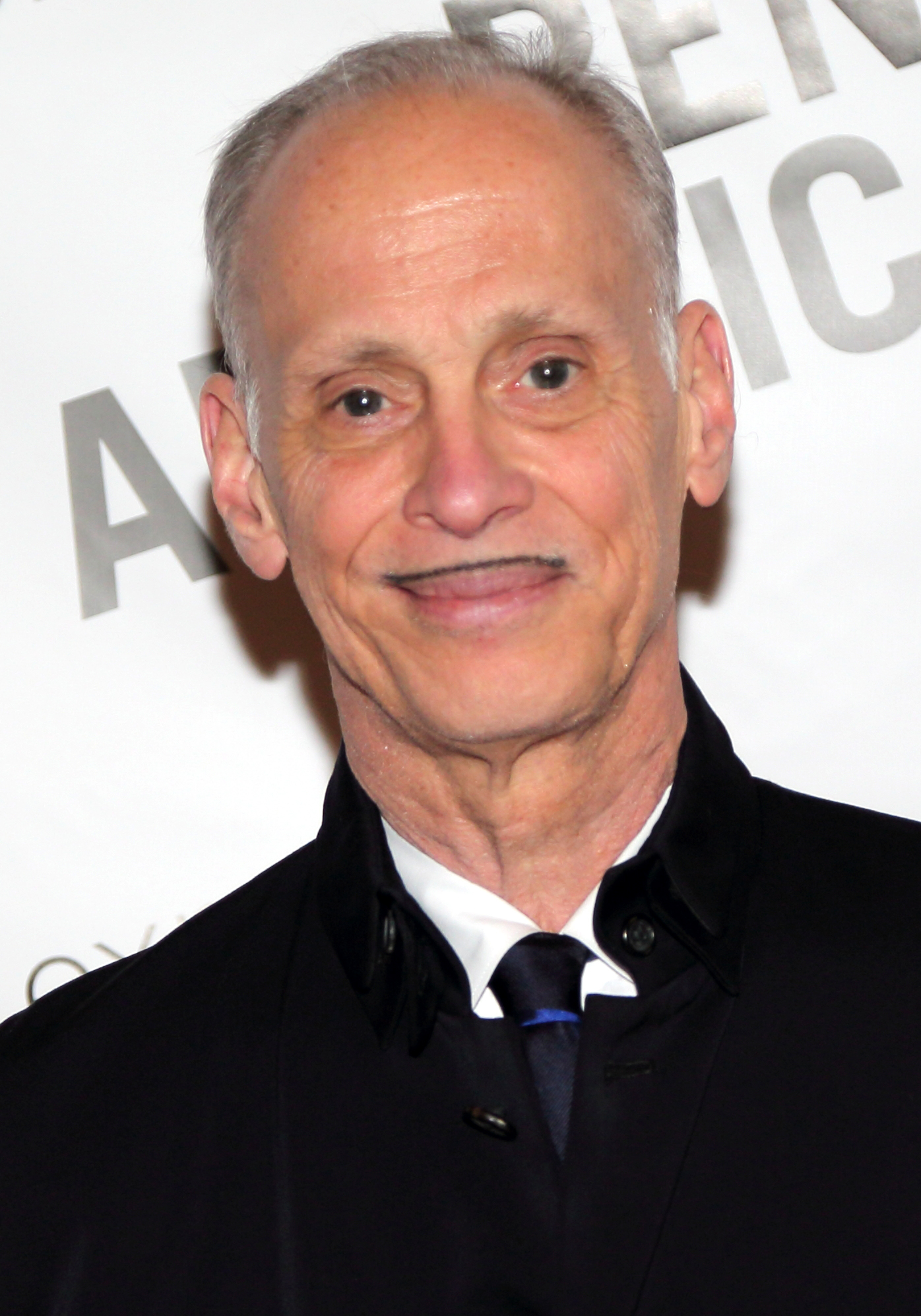
John Waters with a pencil moustache

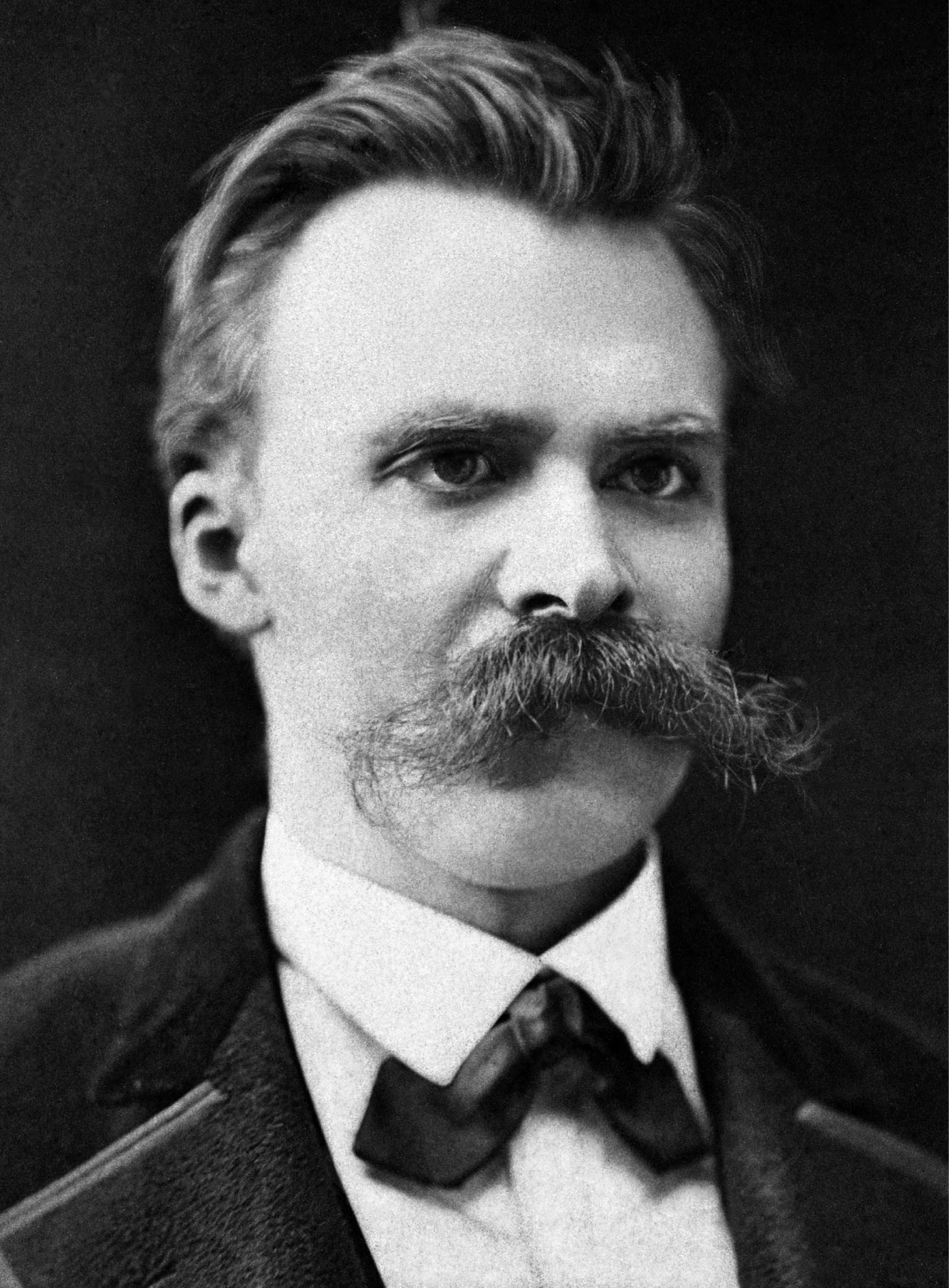
Friedrich Nietzsche with a walrus moustache

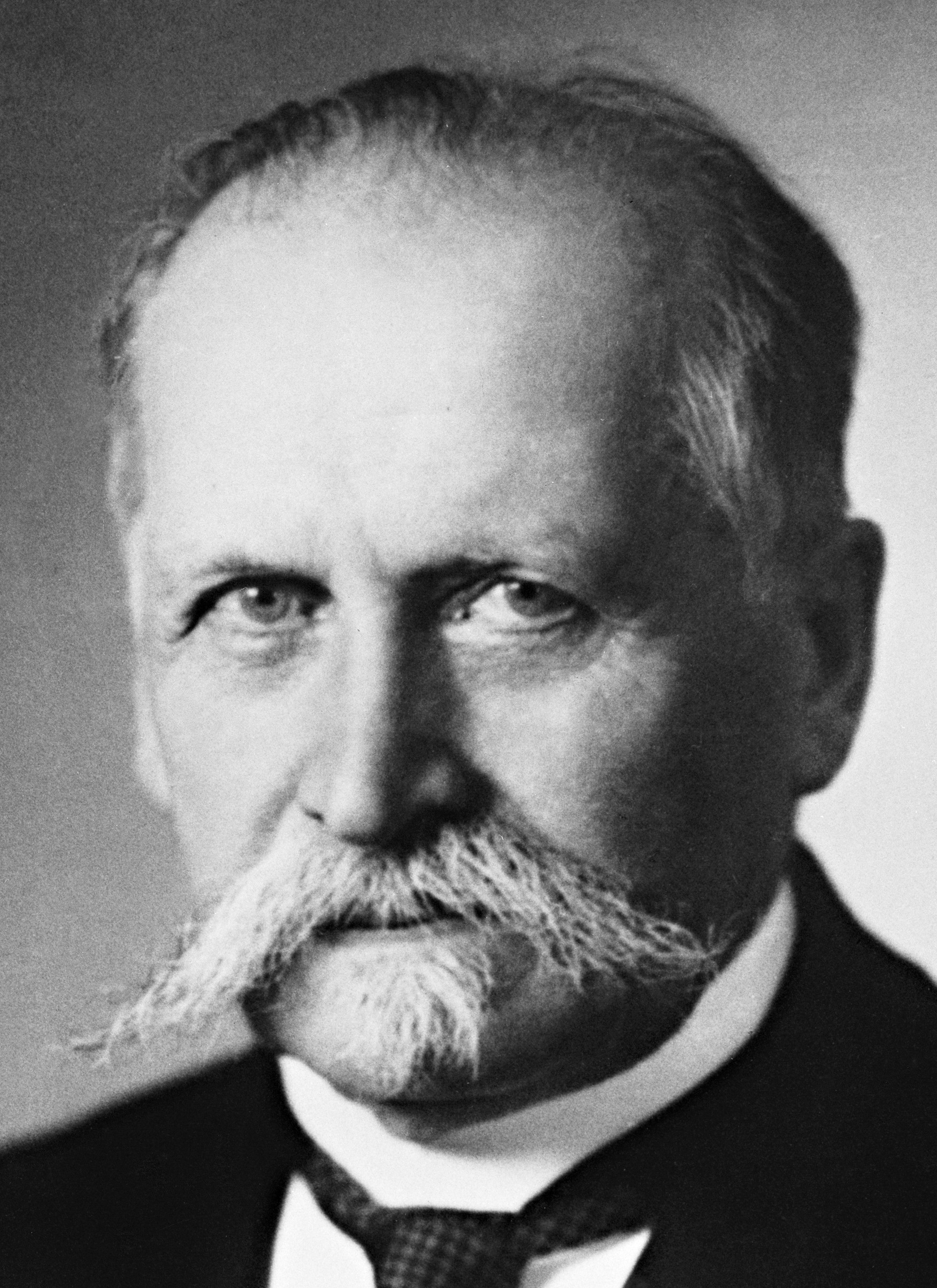
Kyösti Kallio, the 4th President of Finland, with a walrus moustache

British Lord Kitchener featured on a WWI recruiting poster

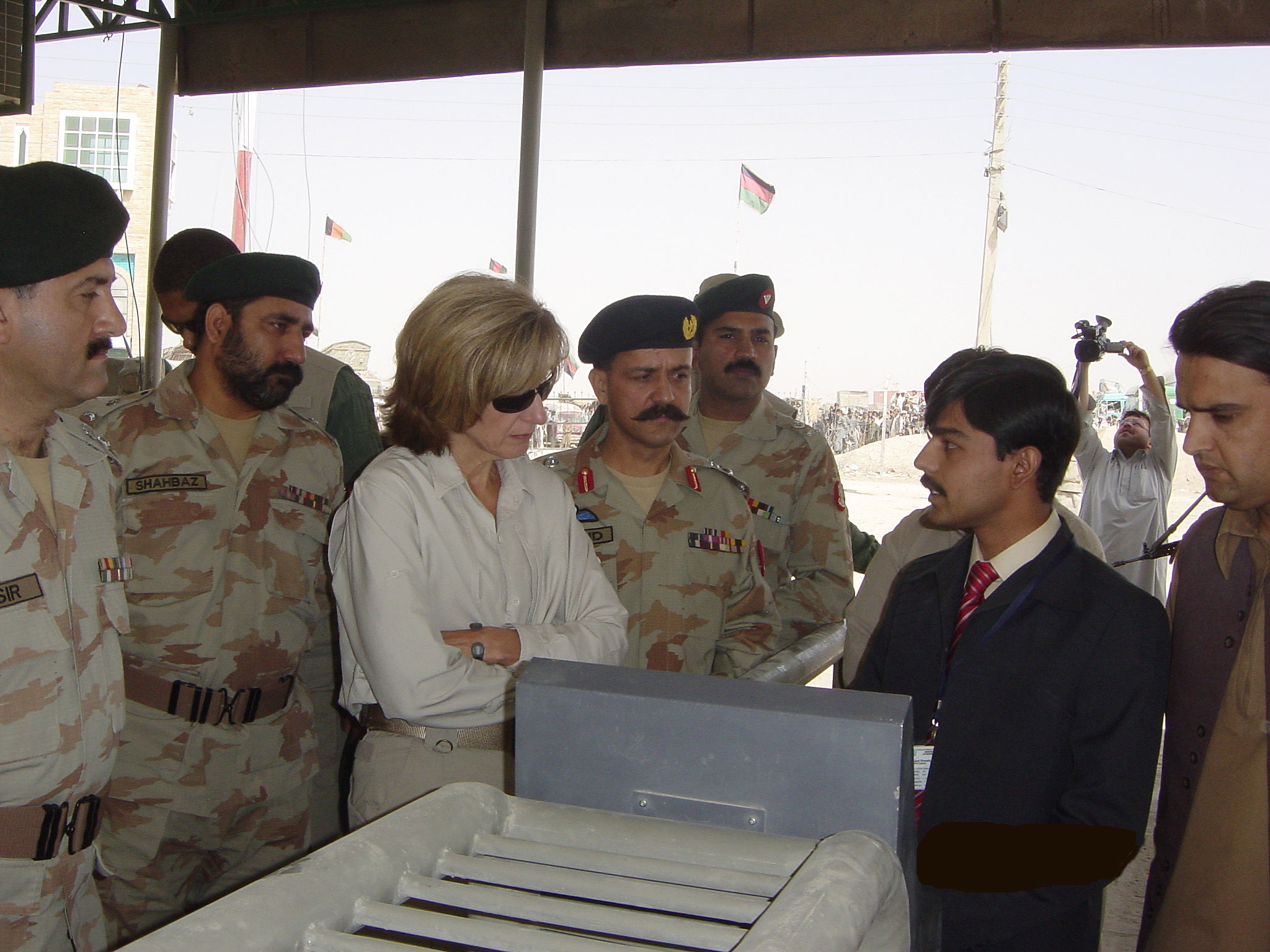
Military personnel with moustaches, at the Afghanistan-Pakistan border.

== See also ==
- American Mustache Institute
- Beard
- Bearded lady
- List of facial hairstyles
- Moustache cup
- Movember
- Stache for cash
- Tacheback
