= Elliot Offner =

Elliot Melville Offner (July 12, 1931 – October 15, 2010) was an American sculptor, painter, printmaker and typographer, and longtime professor of art at Smith College.

== Early life ==
Offner was born in Brooklyn, New York City in 1931, the second of three brothers. His parents Samuel and Helen (Wolowitz) had emigrated from Eastern Europe. He studied at Cooper Union before receiving his Bachelor of Fine Arts and Master of Fine Arts from Yale University, where he was a protege of Joseph Albers. He joined the faculty at Smith College in 1960 and was appointed Andrew W. Mellon Professor of Humanities in 1974. Offner taught at Smith until his retirement in 2004.

== Career ==
During his artistic career, Offner was the subject of 27 solo exhibitions, and numerous group exhibitions. His public works include "Loon, Great Blue Heron and Grouse", at the Nicollet Mall, Minneapolis, MN; "Child With Dog", Children's Inn, National Institute of Health, Washington, DC; "Monument to the Letter Carriers of America", Milwaukee, WI, "Holocaust Memorial Figure", Cathedral of St. John the Divine, New York, "Karl Lehmann Memorial Plaque", Archaeological Museum, Samothrace, Greece, among numerous others.

His creative output peaked from 1964 until 2007, during which time Mr. Offner won many awards such as the Louis Comfort Tiffany Foundation Award (1964, 1965); grants from National Institute of Arts and Letters (1965) and National Council on the Arts and Humanities (1966, 1967); a Gold Medal from the National Sculpture Society (1992). In 2003, Offner was named 2003 Master Wildlife Artist and given International Master Wildlife Sculptor Medal and Exhibition, Leigh Yawkey Woodson Art Museum, Wausau, WI. After retiring from Smith College in 2004, he following year he was given an Honorary Doctorate from Converse College in Spartanburg, SC, and was named one of four Kenan Master Sculptors for 2005. In 2007, for the first time in a decade, the National Sculpture Society granted its Medal of Honor to Offner, and featured the artist in its Sculptor Profile.

Also in 2007, Brookgreen Gardens in Pawley's Island, SC, opened the Elliot and Rosemary Offner Sculpture Learning & Research Center. Brookgreen Gardens is a National Historic Landmark with the most significant collection of figurative sculpture in an outdoor setting by American artists in the world.

Offner served as a Visiting Artist at Brandeis University, Yale University, Royal College of Art, and Cambridge University. Offner also served as president of the National Sculpture Society.

Elliot Melville Offner died in 2010 in Northampton, Massachusetts. He was survived by his wife Rosemary O'Connell Offner, daughters Helen and Emily and son Daniel. Rosemary passed a year later, in 2011.
