= Eponymous hairstyle =

Hairstyle associated with a particular individual

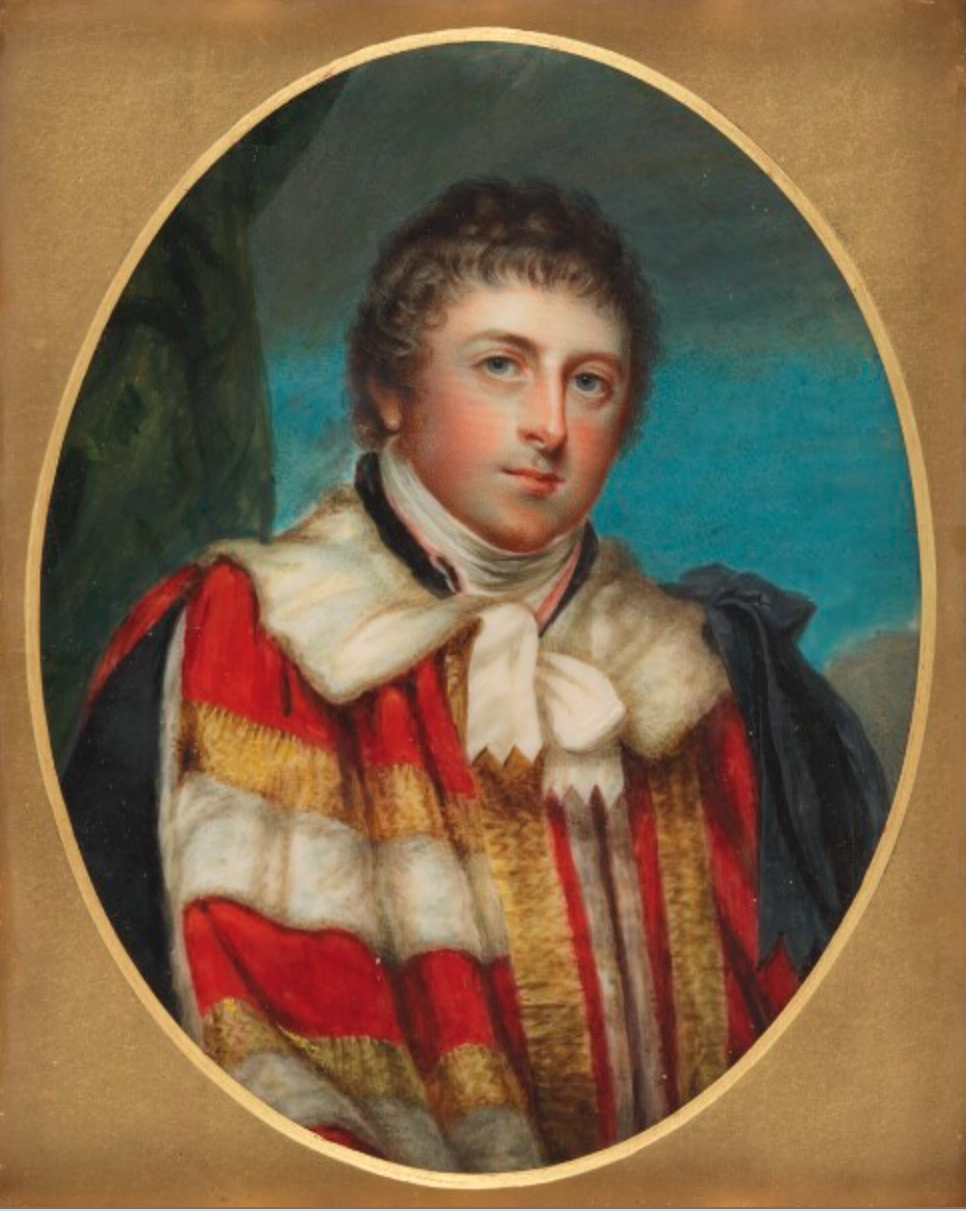
Francis Russell, 5th Duke of Bedford, originator of the short, unpowdered "Bedford Crop" in 1795, arguably the most influential innovation in hairstyles, as men's hair has mostly remained short ever since

An eponymous hairstyle is a particular hairstyle that has become fashionable during a certain period of time through its association with a prominent individual.

== Women ==
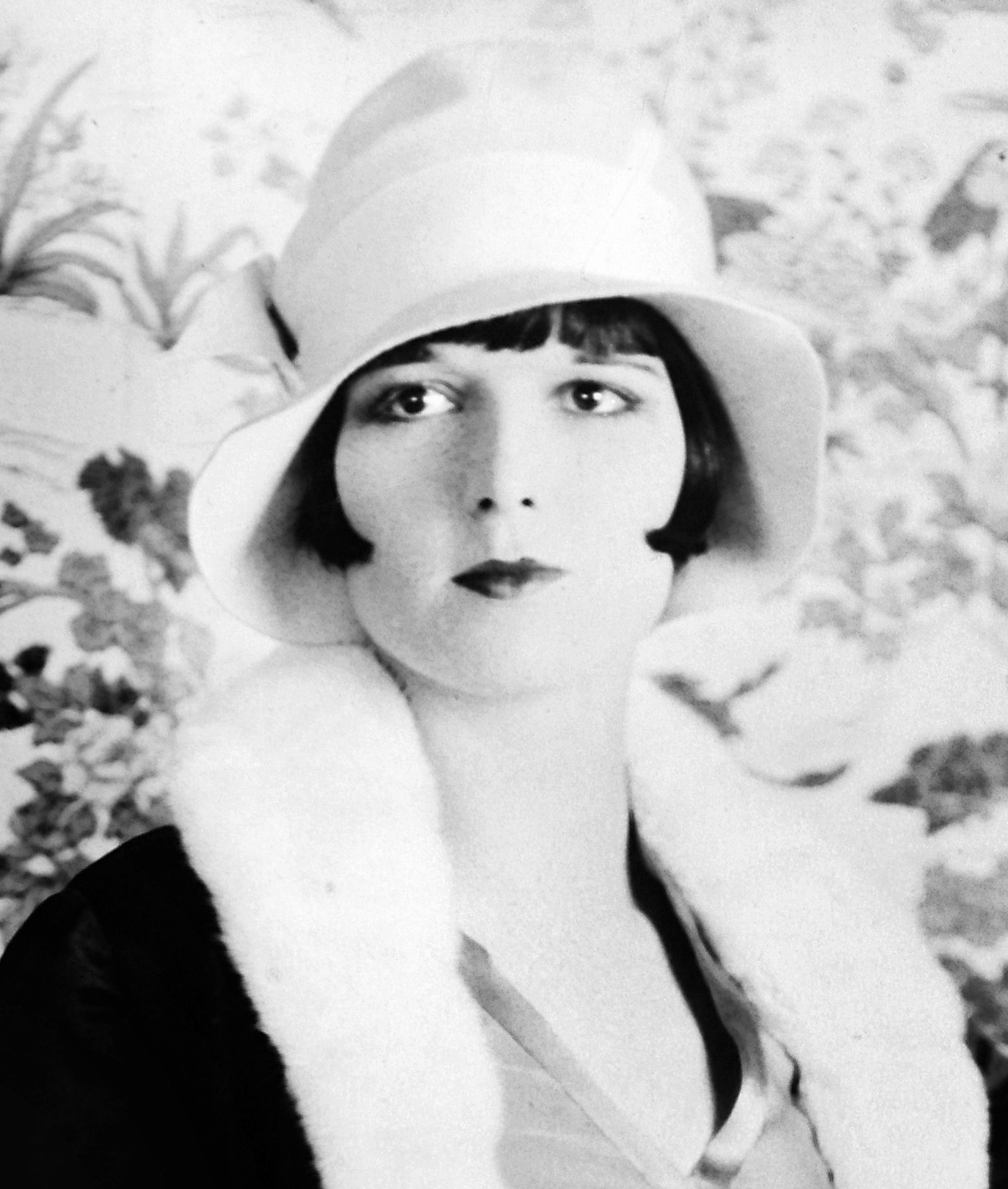
Louise Brooks and her bob, c. 1928

=== 1920–1950 ===
In the early 20th century, the "Louise Brooks bob" (Paramount studios' description c. 1927 of the defining "bob cut" of the "flapper" era) was iconic to the extent of being reproduced by Cyd Charisse in the film Singin' in the Rain (1952), by Melanie Griffith in Something Wild (1986), and by Rose McGowan in The Doom Generation (1995). Although photographs show that Brooks had in fact worn what became known as a bob from childhood, the actress Colleen Moore c. 1923 was probably the first to be widely associated with it. However, there was never such a thing as a "Colleen" and it was Brooks, with her unmistakable sense of "It", that turned the "Louise" into an eponymous classic. Eighty years later, the term was still part of fashion's lexicon: "With her trademark Louise Brooks bob ... Jean Muir built a career as one of Britain's greatest designers."

=== 1950s–1960s ===
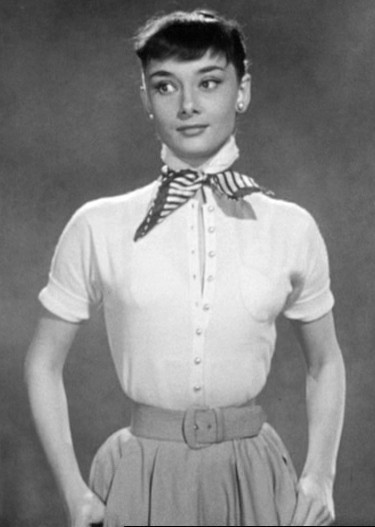
Audrey Hepburn with style-setting "gamine" haircut in Roman Holiday (1953)

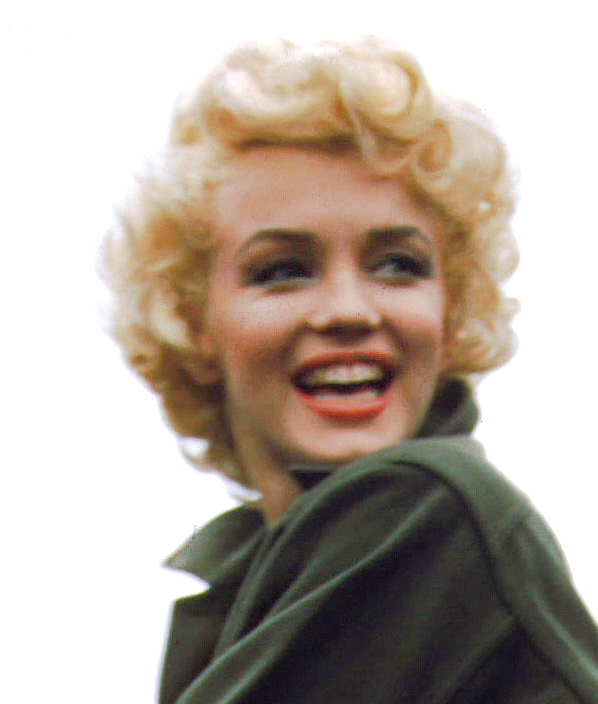
Marilyn Monroe, 1954

The "Audrey Hepburn look”, associated since the 1950s with the Anglo-Belgian film actress, owed itself principally to the intrinsic chic of Hepburn herself (a factor identified by Edith Head) and the designs of French couturier Hubert de Givenchy. However, although never strictly eponymous, Hepburn's hairstyles - especially those in the films Sabrina (1954) (short with a fringe, or "bangs", across the forehead) and Breakfast at Tiffany's (1961) (pulled back and gently piled up around the crown) have been widely copied. The social historian Dominic Sandbrook wrote of "black-jersied gamines with Audrey Hepburn hairdos" presiding over British coffee bars in the mid-1950s.

Marilyn Monroe's signature platinum blonde look, worn throughout the height of her career, was called The Marilyn. In the 1960s, the pixie cut worn by the British model Lesley Lawson was called The Twiggy after her nickname.

Other short "gamine" cuts to have attracted imitators included Jane Fonda's as the call-girl Bree Daniels in the film Klute (1971), and that adopted in 2005 by the actress Keira Knightley, a longer, slightly shaggier version of Hepburn's cut. Fonda's style, which was also captured in photographs following her arrest for allegedly assaulting a police officer at Cleveland airport in 1970, was sometimes - even 30 years later - referred to as the "Klute shag".

=== 1970s–1990s ===
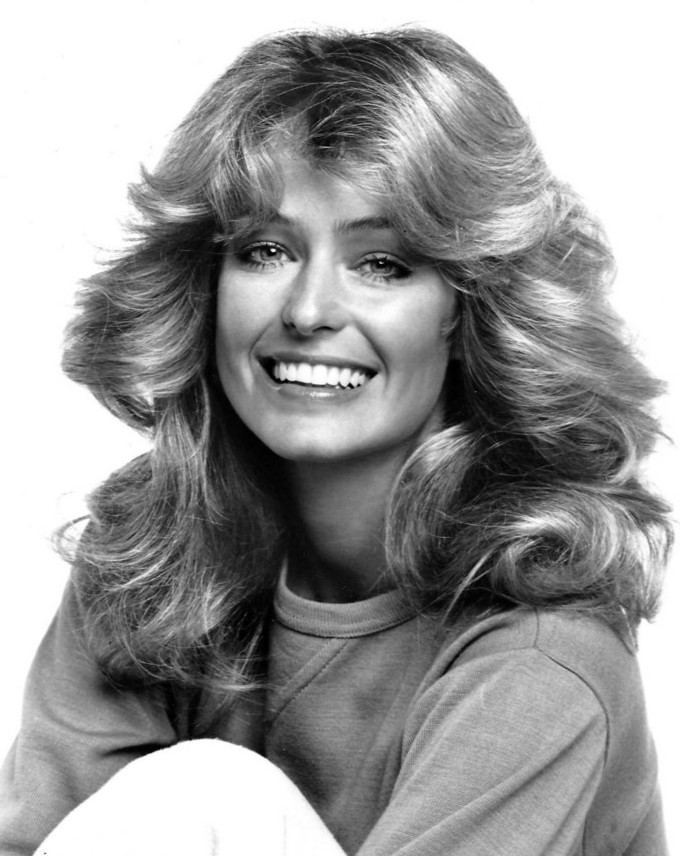
Farrah Fawcett, 1977

A famous example of this phenomenon was the feathered hairstyle of Farrah Fawcett, as seen in the American television series Charlie's Angels and her popular red swimsuit pin-up poster in the 1970s. Another around that time was the short "Purdey" cut adopted by British actress Joanna Lumley for her role of that name in the television series The New Avengers, and the short Dorothy Hamill Wedge hairstyle.

Other period examples such as "Bo Derek" (braided hair with beads, as she wore in the film 10 (1979)); and the "Rachel" (after the straightened shag popularized in the mid-1990s by Rachel Green, the character played by Jennifer Aniston in the TV sitcom Friends);.

In Japan, Seiko-chan cut, named after Seiko Matsuda, was popular in the 1980s.

==== "Wannabe" effect ====
Imitation of such styles can sometimes be attributed to what became known in the 1980s as the "wannabe" effect, a term used particularly with reference to young women who wished to emulate (i.e. "wanna be" like) the American singer Madonna. A 2010 study of British women found that half took a copy of a celebrity's photograph to their salons to obtain a similar hairstyle.

The quest for a particular eponymous style was caricatured in Plum Sykes' novel Bergdorf Blondes (2004), in which it was rumored that glamorous New York heiress Julie Bergdorf had her blonde hair touched up every 13 days ("$450 a highlight") by a stylist at her family's store, Bergdorf Goodman. Thus, other "Thirteen Day Blondes" who attained Julie's precise colour—likened to that of the "very white" hair of Carolyn Bessette-Kennedy—became known as "Bergdorf Blondes".

=== 2000 to present ===
Recent examples of eponymous hairstyles include the Pob (Posh + Bob) named after Victoria "Posh" Beckham (called in 2007 the most wanted hair since the "Rachel"); and the "Dido flip", a "choppy shag" associated with the singer Dido in the early years of the 21st century.

In 2006, The Times noted the transformation over several years in the hairstyle of Yulia Tymoshenko, a former Prime Minister of Ukraine. Illustrated instructions for replicating Tymoshenko's distinctive blonde braided crown were headed "How to do the Yuliya".

In 2009, the most requested hairstyle for women was the "Textured and Tousled, or Curled and Swirled" long, blonde "Gossip Girl Look" done by actress Blake Lively.

== Men ==
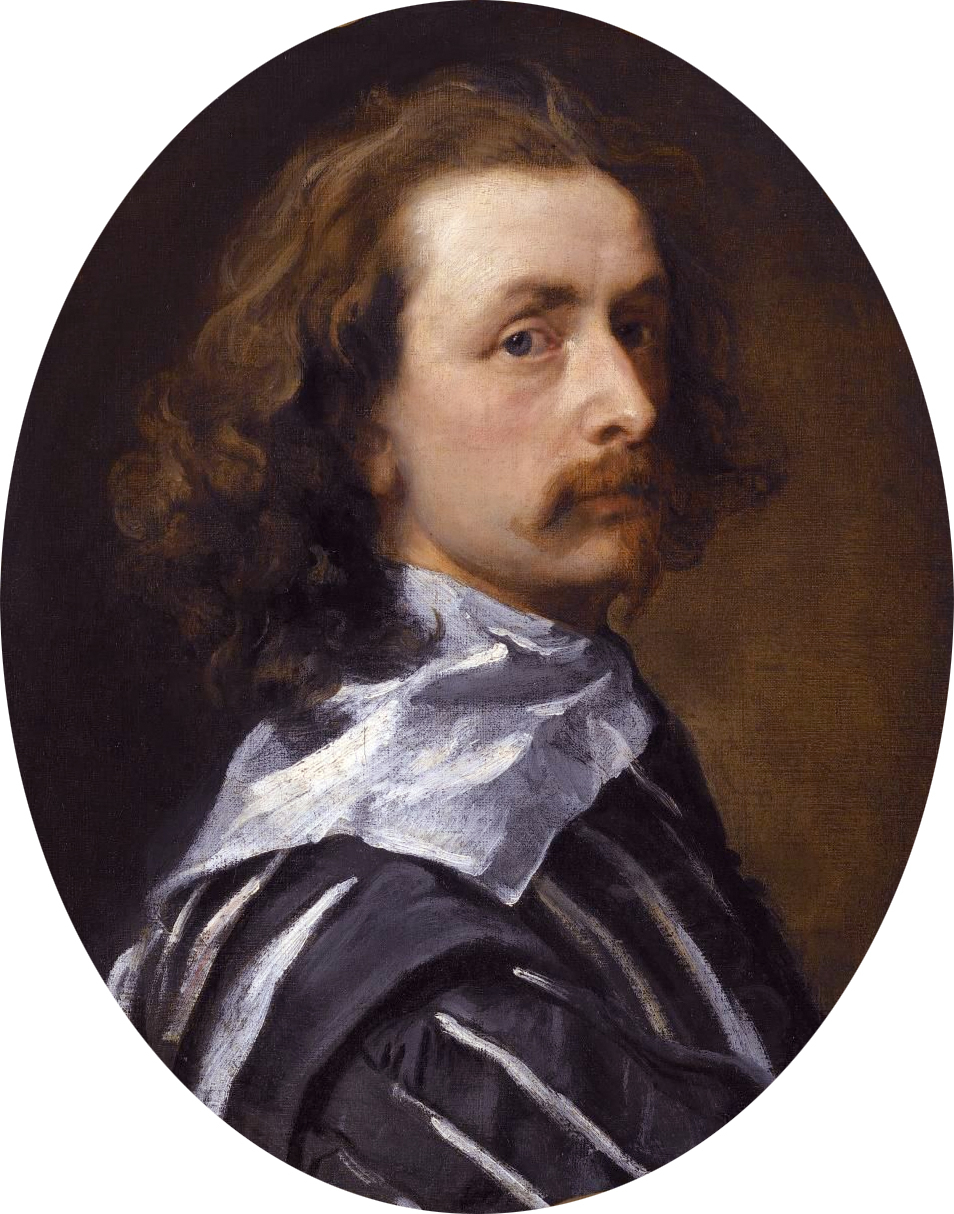
Anthony van Dyck with a Van Dyck Beard

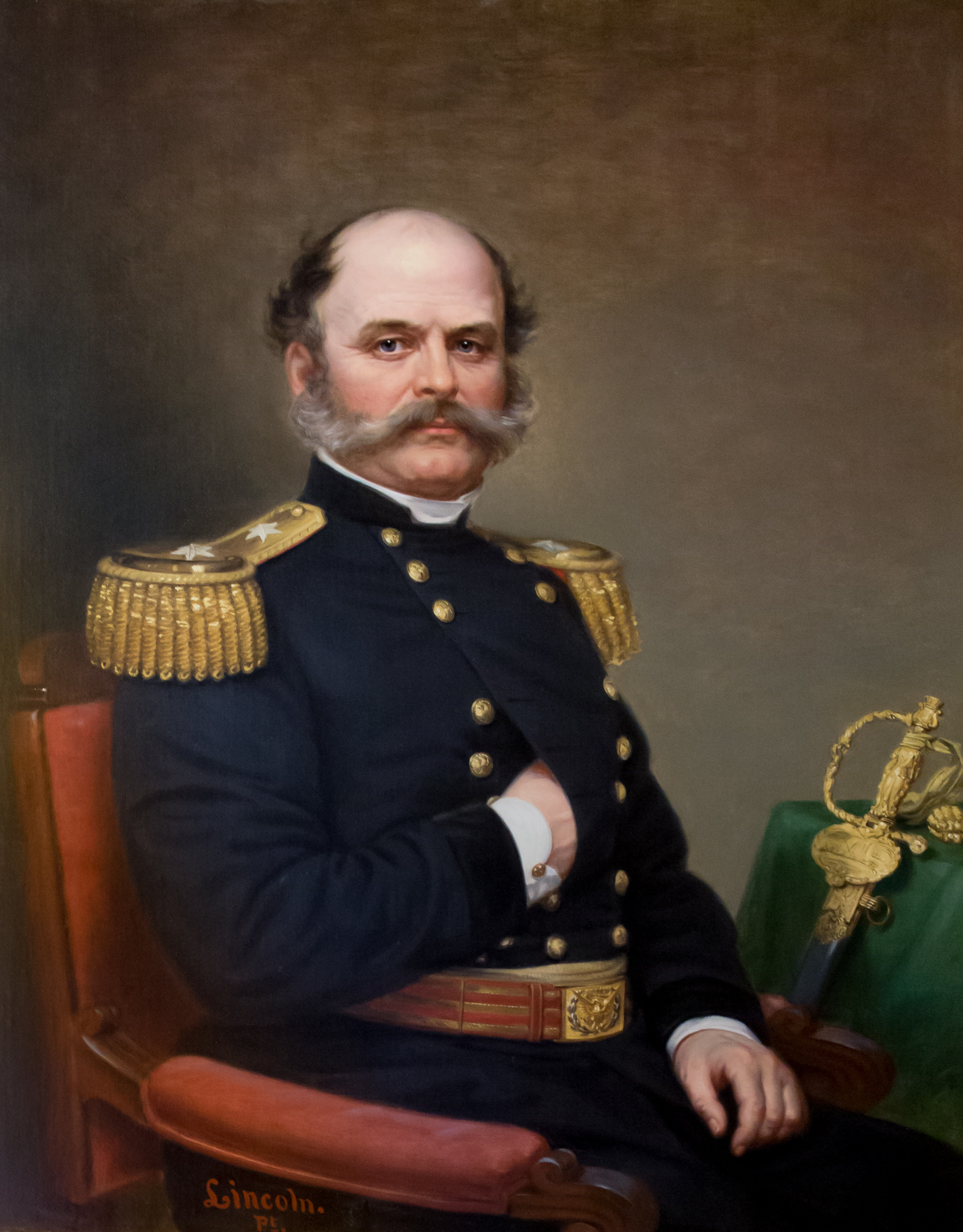
American Civil War general Ambrose Burnside with sideburns

=== Before 1800 ===
In Europe, the Roman legions popularized short hair for free citizens, especially the close-cropped Caesar cut associated to this day with statues of Tiberius Julius Caesar.

The 9th-century Islamic trend-setter Ziryab is said to have popularized a shorter male hairstyle in Cordoba, with bangs down to the eyebrows and straight across the forehead, and leaving the neck and ears uncovered.

Before and during the English Civil War, the Van Dyke beard was worn by many cavaliers in imitation of Charles I of England. The Dutch artist Anthony van Dyck sported the same beard, as did the subjects of some of his paintings. The name for the beard style came much later.

In the transition from wigs to natural hair, the cut "à la Titus" was important. This was a layered cut usually with some tresses hanging down, named after the Roman Titus Junius Brutus, a character in Voltaire's play Brutus, when the actor François-Joseph Talma shocked audiences by performing (in fact initially another character) with short hair and wearing a toga. The style was adopted by both men and adventurous women like Lady Caroline Lamb, the Journal de Paris reporting in 1802 that "more than half of elegant women were wearing their hair or wig à la Titus".

=== Regency era ===
An early example of an eponymous hairstyle was associated with the 5th Duke of Bedford. In 1795, when the British government levied a tax on hair powder, as a form of protest Bedford abandoned the powdered and tied hairstyle commonly worn by men of that era in favor of a cropped, unpowdered style, making a bet with friends to do likewise. The new style became known as the Bedford Level, a pun on a geographical feature of The Fens also known as the "Bedford Level" and also making reference to Bedford's radical ("leveller") political views. It was also known as the Bedford Crop. Although natural, the Bedford crop was usually styled with wax to form a side parting.

=== Victorian and Edwardian periods ===
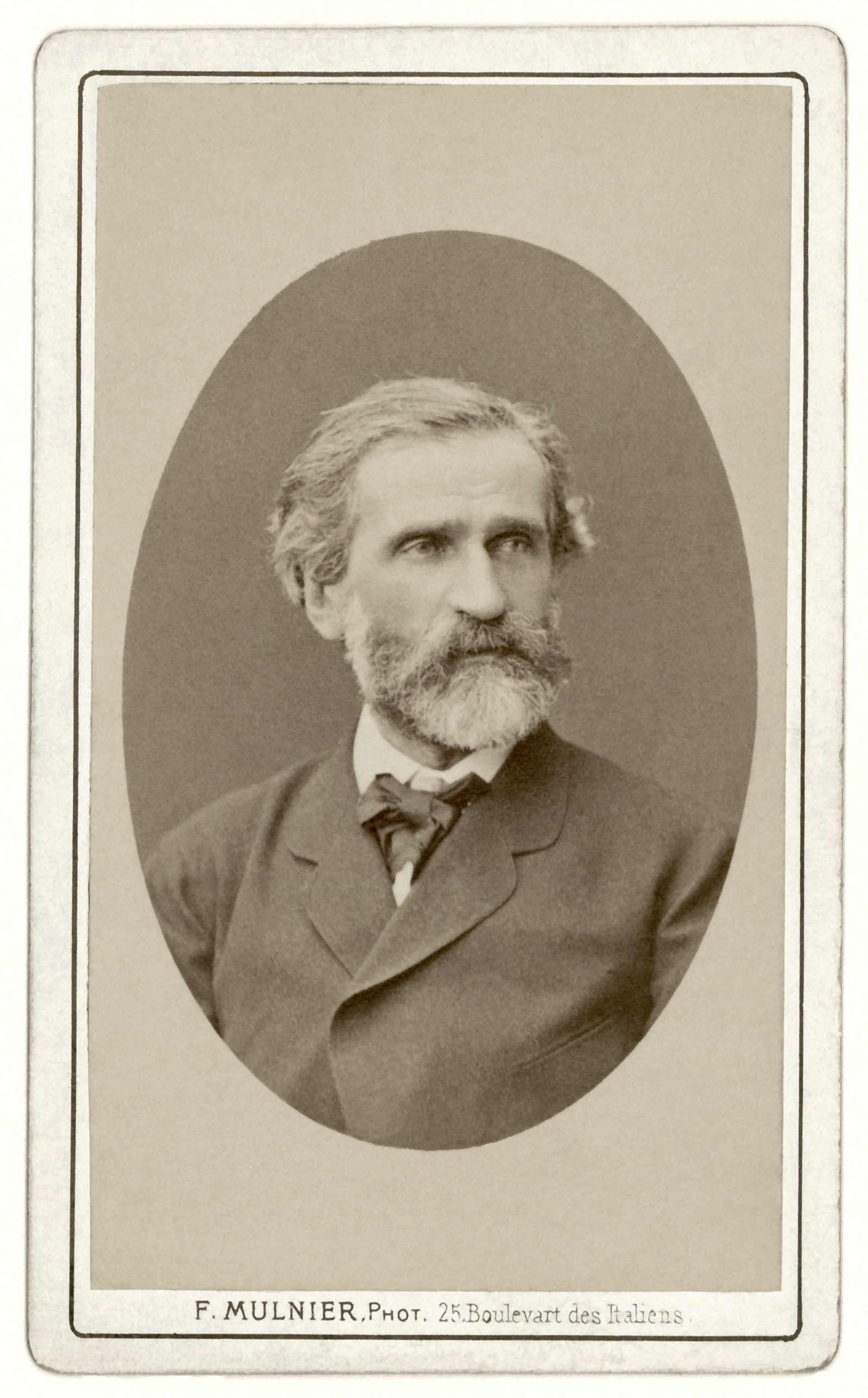
A Verdi beard

During the mid 19th century, facial hair became fashionable among soldiers and civilians. Examples included the large muttonchop sideburns popularised by Ambrose Burnside, and variants of the full beard named after Verdi and Garibaldi. In Australia, a long beard is known as a Ned Kelly beard after the famous bandit.

The Beard imperial or Napoleon, which combined a handlebar moustache with a soul patch, was named after Emperor Napoleon III of France, and the chinstrap beard was informally known as the Abraham Lincoln.

=== 20th century ===
The Fu Manchu moustache, first worn by Mandarins in Imperial China, gained its name from the fictional supervillain Fu Manchu, a personification of the turn of the century yellow peril stereotype.

Since 1945, the toothbrush moustache has been nicknamed the Chaplin and The Hitler.

During the 1950s, pompadour hairstyles were popularized by rock and roll singer Elvis Presley, mostly among the youth and the greaser subculture.

The cover band The Crewcuts were the first to connect hair with pop music, but they were named after the hairstyle, rather than the reverse. Although eponymous styles are mostly associated with women, the "mop-top" Beatle cut of the 1960s (after the rock group of that name) was one famous and widely copied example of such a style for men.

In the early 1970s the singer David Bowie popularized the so-called "Ziggy cut", an orange-red form of "mullet" associated with the rather androgynous image that he promoted through his albums The Rise and Fall of Ziggy Stardust and the Spiders from Mars (1972) and Aladdin Sane (1973). To the extent that Bowie during this period appeared to assume the persona of "Ziggy Stardust", the Ziggy cut can be regarded, at least partially, as an eponymous style.

The shaved head, which had become a rarity by the mid 70s, was widely known as the Kojak or Yul Brynner style.

=== Modern era ===
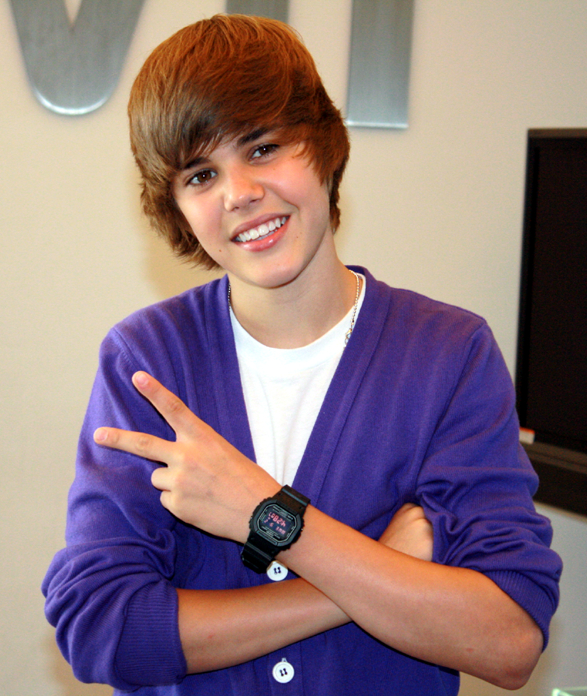
Justin Bieber in 2009

In the late 1990s, with the success of "ER", George Clooney popularized the Caesar-style haircut worn by his character, Dr. Doug Ross. The style worked equally well for both young and older men alike, and Clooney's distinguished salt and pepper color became very popular.

In more recent times the hair of footballers Kevin Keegan, who acquired a curly "bubble perm" while playing for Southampton in the early 1980s, and David Beckham gave rise to much copying, but a "Beckham" was whatever style ("buzz-cut", cornrows, Fauxhawk, even an Alice band) he happened to wear at a given time.

A more specific eponymous example was the so-called "Sawyer" of James "Sawyer" Ford, the character played by Josh Holloway in the ABC-TV series Lost (2004–2010), or the shaggy "Justin Bieber haircut" debuted by the pop singer in 2009. Some salons charged up to $150 for the forward-combed look. When Bieber changed his hairstyle in 2011, it received considerable press. He gave the cut hair to talk-show host Ellen DeGeneres, who auctioned Bieber's hair on eBay, earning more than $40,000 for an animal charity.

== See also ==
- List of hairstyles
