= Walrus moustache =

Facial hairstyle

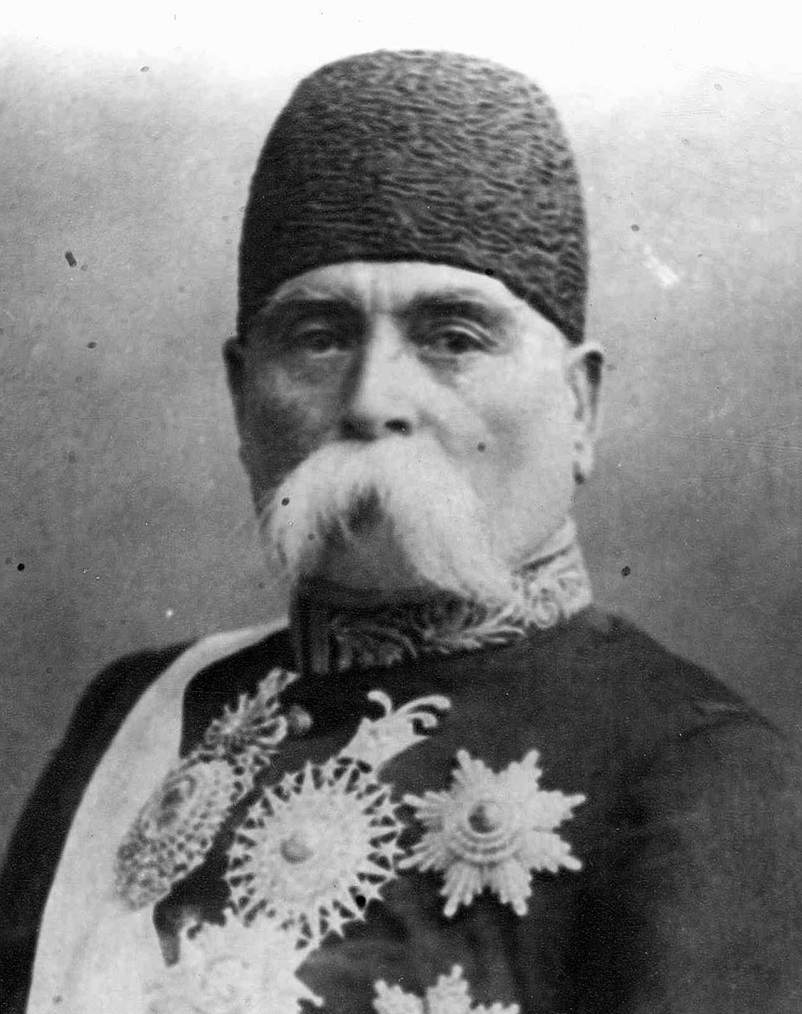
Eyn-ed-Dowleh, the 10th prime minister of Persia

The walrus moustache is characterised by whiskers that are thick, bushy, and drop over the mouth. The style resembles the whiskers of a walrus, hence the name.

== History ==
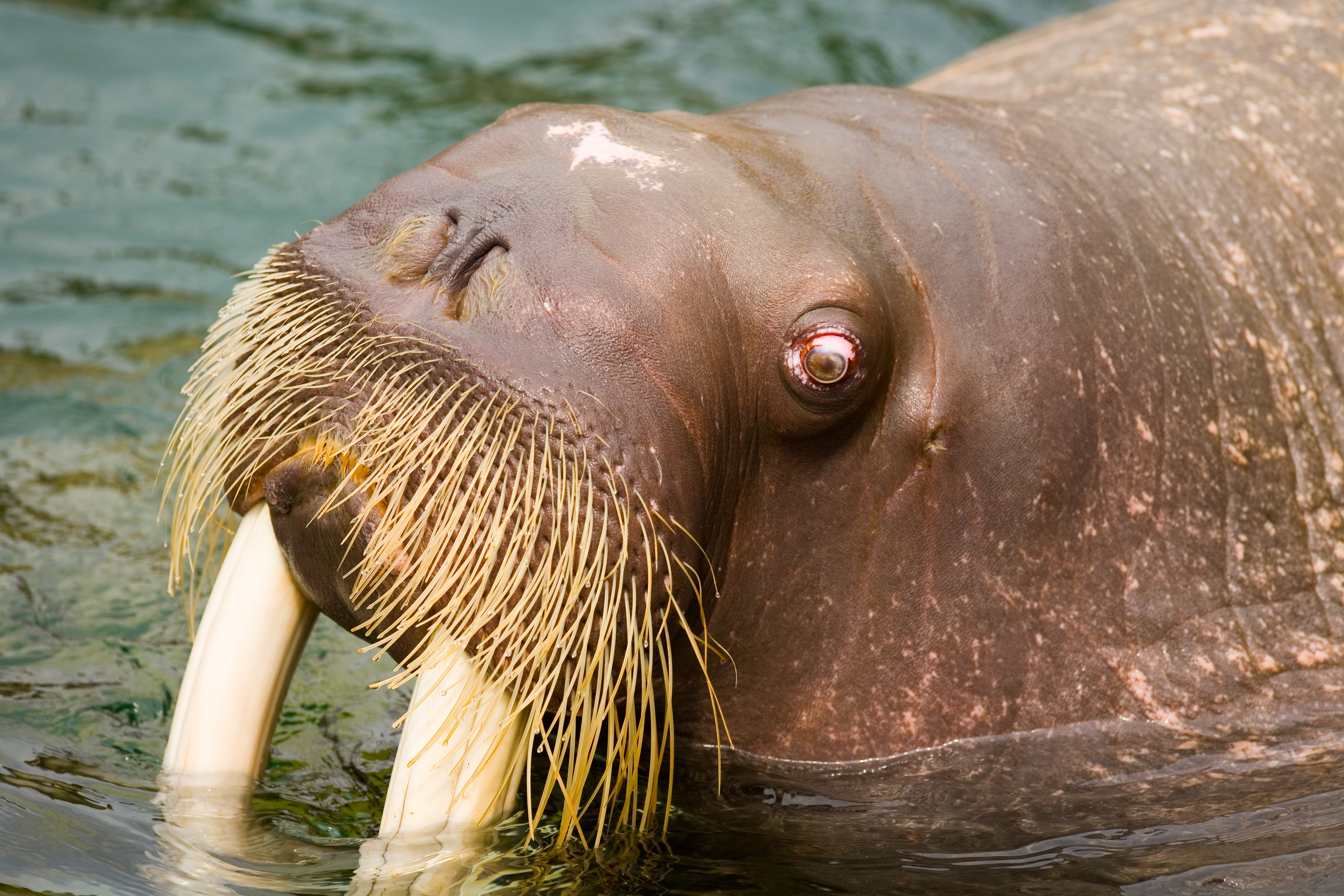
Whiskers (vibrissae) of captive walrus (Japan)

An ethnic trait of Celts and Gauls, but strongly present in the Polish Sarmatian culture as well, the walrus moustache enjoyed immense popularity among men in the latter part of the 19th and early years of the 20th centuries. Gentlemen ranging from scientists to philosophers to politicians often favoured the rugged look that the style created.

After falling out of favour in the 1920s it enjoyed a temporary resurgence during the youth counterculture revolution of the 1960s.

In Poland, the moustache became a symbol of nobility and traditionalism. From the 16th to the 20th century it was a symbol of Polish patriotism and sarmatism. Notable bearers at the time were King John III Sobieski in the 17th century, Langiewicz in the 19th century and Piłsudski in the 20th century.

German philosopher Friedrich Nietzsche also styled his moustache to be Polish, as he claimed Polish heritage in several of his books.

== Styles ==
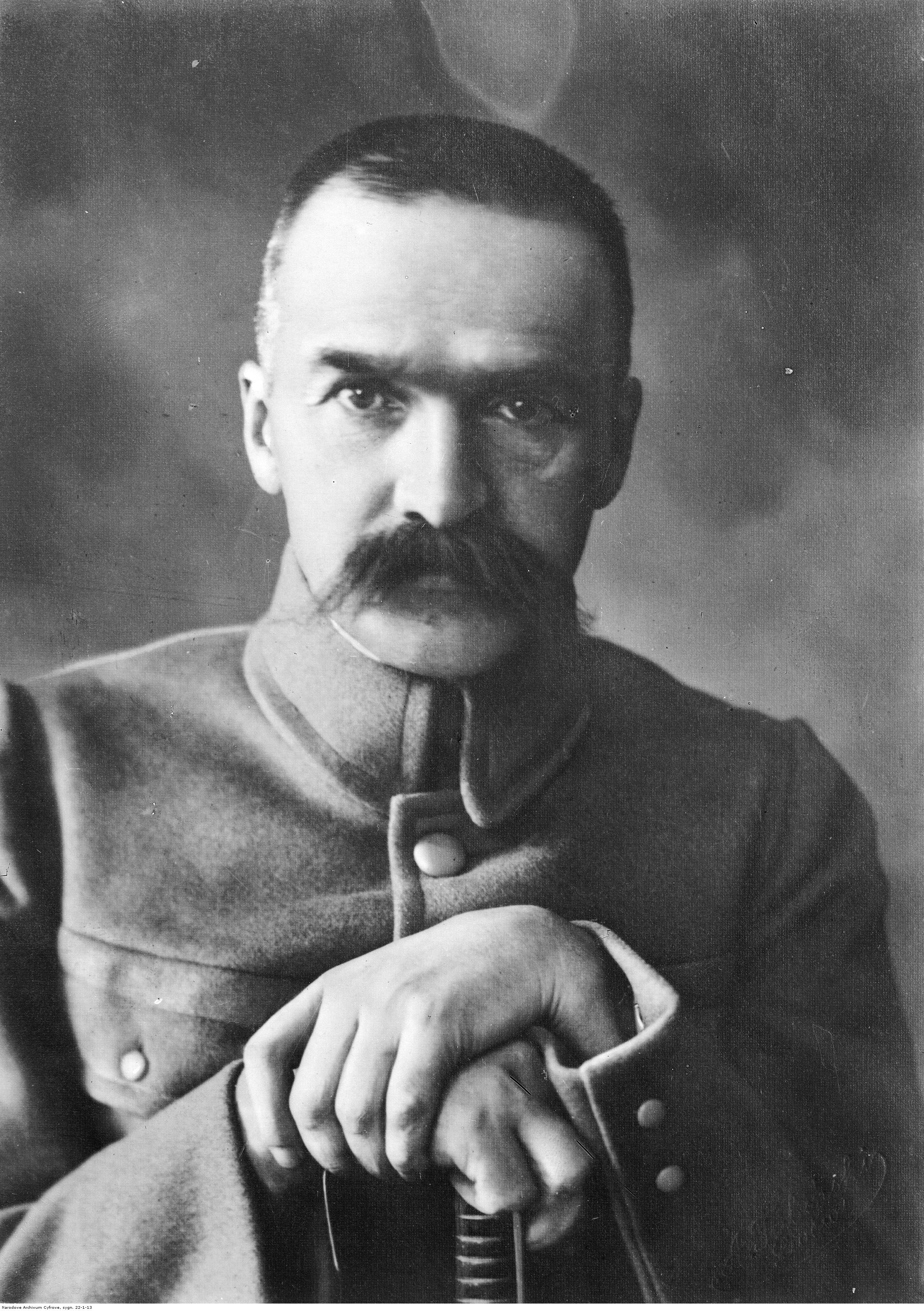
Polish statesman Józef Piłsudski had a traditional Polish "Sarmatian" walrus moustache.

In some instances, the facial hair of the walrus moustache not only drops over the mouth but also extends downward at each corner. The hairline may wrap around the cheeks and connect to sideburns the same thickness, as worn by the man they are named for, Ambrose Burnside.

Many men throughout history have sported a walrus moustache. In Germany, the walrus is commonly associated with Reichskanzler Otto von Bismarck. Other men include actor Wilford Brimley, Kansas City Chiefs coach Andy Reid, American author Mark Twain, American president Theodore Roosevelt, Choctaw chief Green McCurtain, Cherokee chief Dennis Bushyhead, former United States National Security Advisor and United States Ambassador to the United Nations John Bolton, rock musician David Crosby, German philosopher Friedrich Nietzsche, Polish politicians Józef Piłsudski and Lech Wałęsa, Austrian emperor Franz Joseph, former professional hockey player Lanny McDonald, musician John Lennon, actor Stephen Fry, actor Sam Elliott and Soviet General Secretary Joseph Stalin, who at times also wore the handlebar moustache. Jamie Hyneman of MythBusters is also known for his walrus moustache, a common source of humour with his co-host Adam Savage.

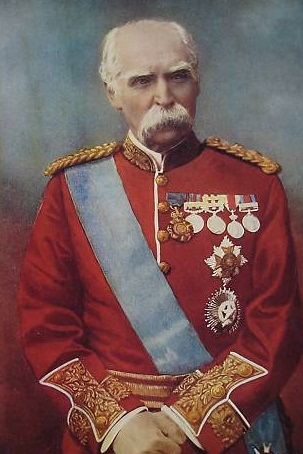
Field Marshal Sir Donald Stewart GCSI (1824–1900)

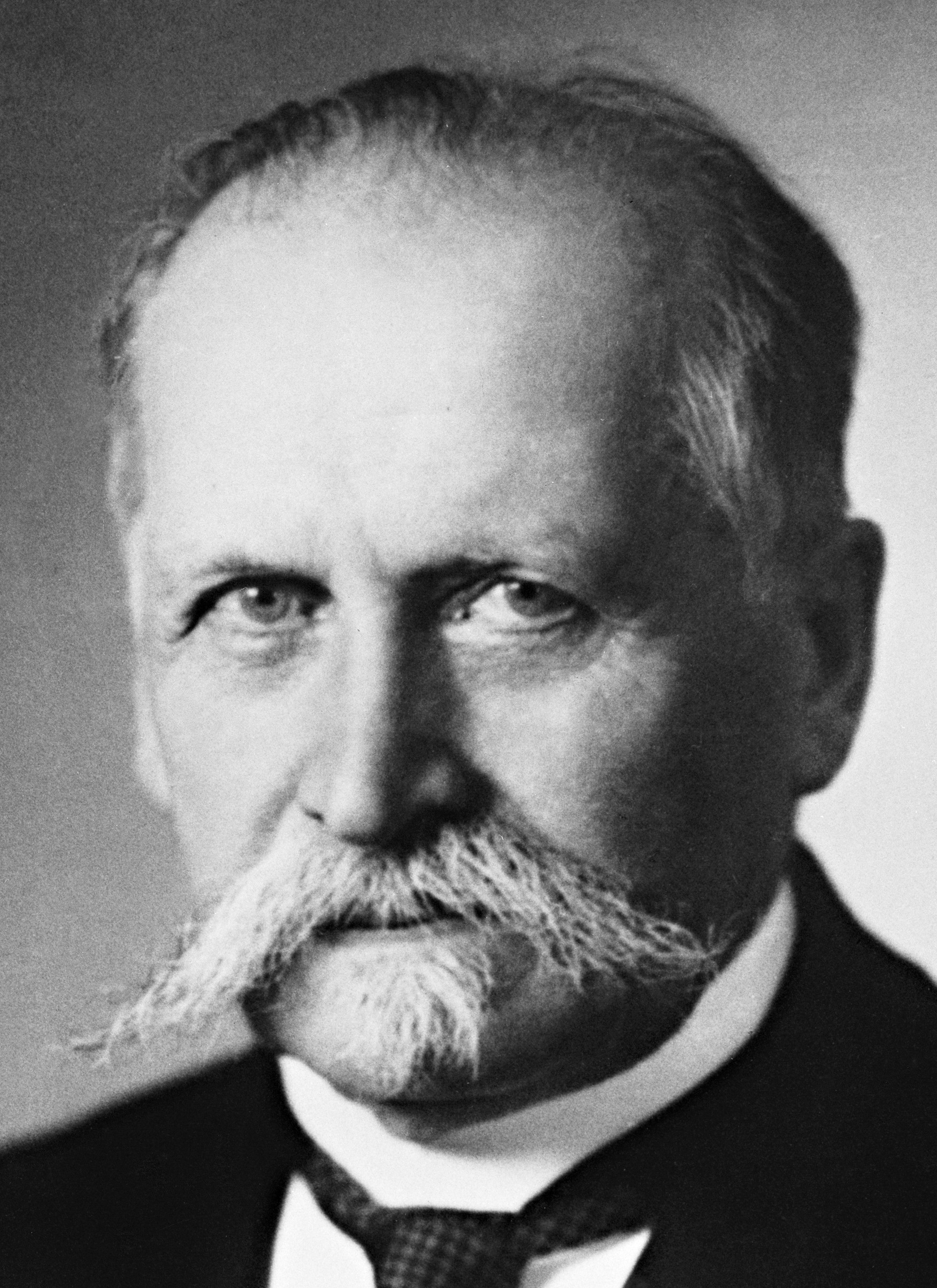
Kyösti Kallio, the 4th president of Finland

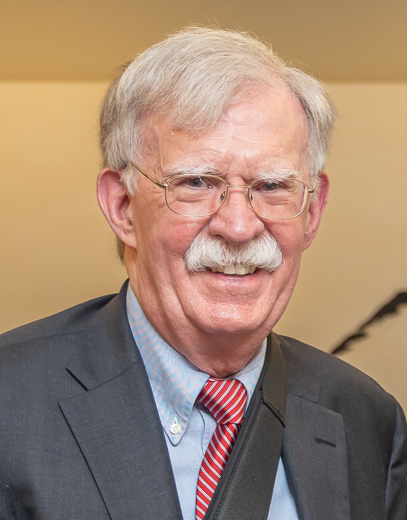
John Bolton, 26th United States National Security Advisor

== See also ==
- List of moustache styles
- List of facial hairstyles
