= Chinstrap =

Chinstrap may refer to:

- Chinstrap, a strap fixed to a helmet or other headgear which passes beneath the chin and holds the headgear in place
- Chinstrap penguin, a species of penguin with markings resembling a chinstrap
- Chinstrap beard, a type of facial hair that resembles a chinstrap
- Colonel Chinstrap, a fictional persona of English comic actor Jack Train
