= Ned Kelly beard =

Style of facial hair

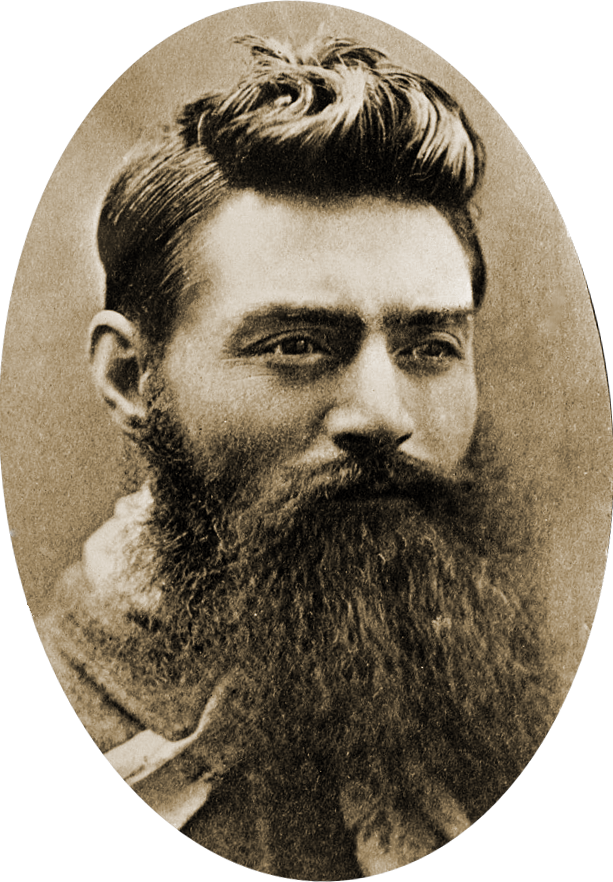
This photograph of Ned Kelly, taken the day before his execution in 1880, provided the inspiration for the term "Ned Kelly beard".

A Ned Kelly beard is a style of facial hair named after 19th-century Australian bushranger and outlaw Ned Kelly. It consists of a full, luxuriant beard and a moustache, and is typically accompanied by short, styled hair. Although the term dates back to the early 20th century, it gained currency in Australia in the 2000s to refer to a trend in hipster fashion, and was named word of the month in March 2014 by the Australian National Dictionary Centre.

== Description ==
The Ned Kelly is said to require a high degree of maintenance and grooming.

== History ==
The full beard became popular among men in Western countries in the mid-19th-century, and was worn by many Australian bushrangers, including Ned Kelly, who was hanged in Melbourne in 1880 after he and his gang killed policemen. The day before his execution at Old Melbourne Gaol, Kelly posed for a photographic portrait by Charles Nettleton, which has since become a recognisable image to generations of Australians. The Australian National Dictionary Centre cites this photograph as the inspiration for the term Ned Kelly beard.

The term was shortlisted in the Australian National Dictionary Centre's 2014 word of the year competition, but lost to shirtfront, an Australian rules football term.

== Examples ==
Celebrities who have been said to sport the Ned Kelly beard style include Australian rules football player Jimmy Bartel, politician Phil Cleary, Socceroos captain Mile Jedinak, and freestyle skier Anton Grimus. In 2008, journalist Mark Willacy described Hamas military leader Salah Shehade as having a "square Ned Kelly beard".

== See also ==
- List of facial hairstyles
