= Chinstrap beard =

Type of facial hair

The chinstrap beard is a type of facial hair that extends from the hair line of one side of the face to the other, including sideburns, following the jawline. It is much like the chin curtain; unlike the chin curtain though, it does not cover the entire chin, but only the very edges of the jaw and chin. There is typically no mustache, which is shaved off.

It was fashionable from the late 18th century through the mid-19th century in Europe, and later in Russia and Japan. It was worn by West Point graduate Bezaleel W. Armstrong, English missionary Hudson Taylor, and Paul Kruger, the president of the 19th-century Transvaal Republic (in what is now South Africa).

It is also worn today, by musicians like Stormzy. and athletes such as Dwyane Wade, Elvis Andrus, Raymond Felton, Matt Hardy and David Ortiz.

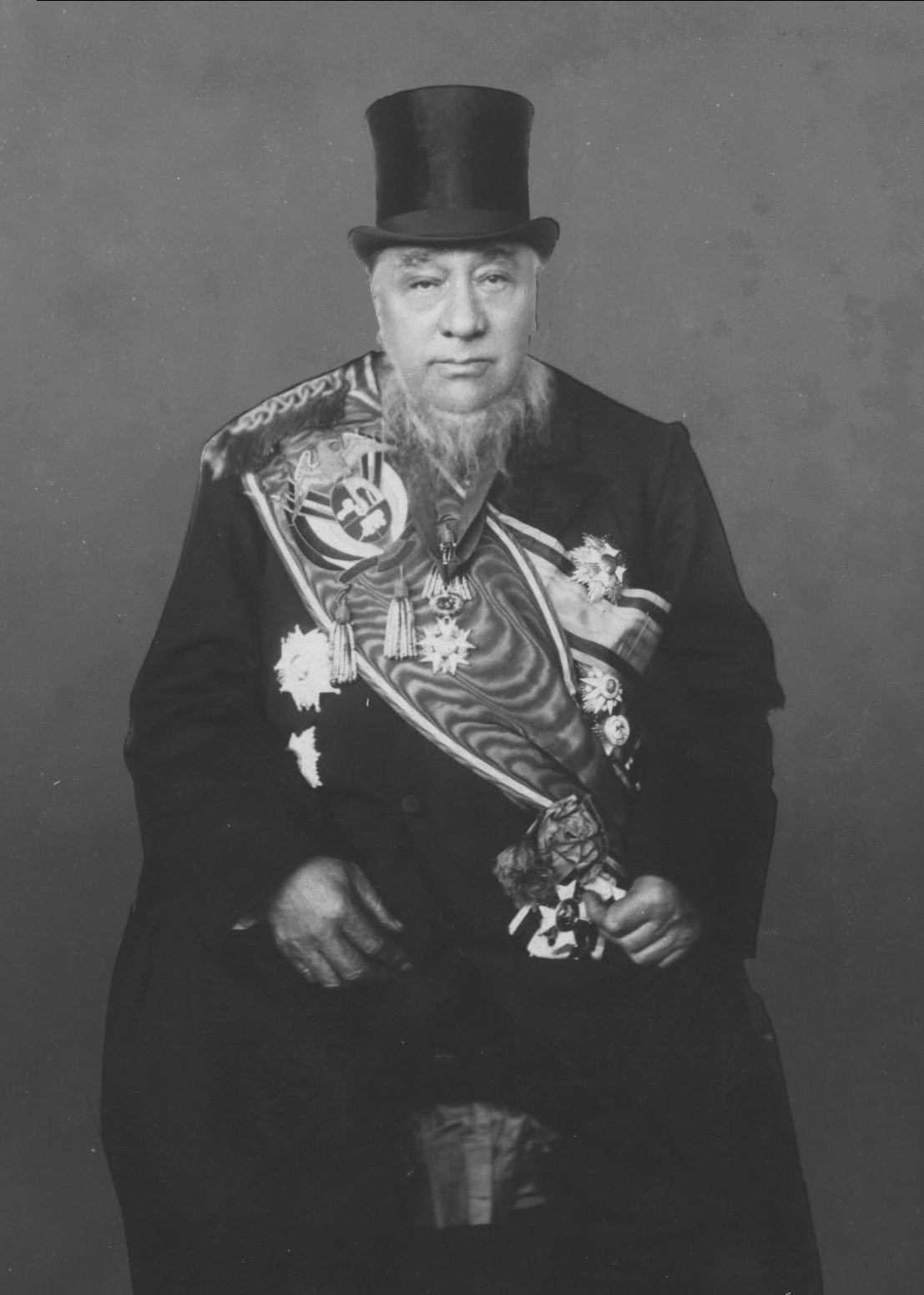
Paul Kruger with chinstrap beard

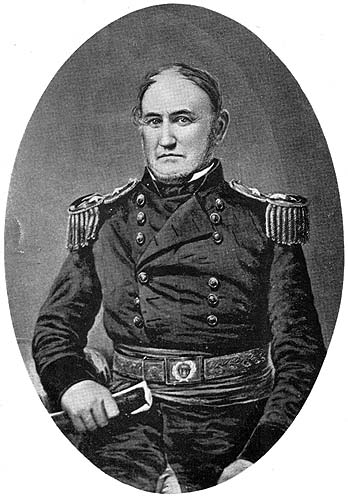
General David Twiggs during the time of the Mexican–American War

== Famous or notable chinstrap beards ==
- Henry David Thoreau, famous Transcendental philosopher and author.
- David E. Twiggs, U.S. Army general who wore a chinstrap beard when facial hair in the military was becoming common.
- Camillo Benso, Count of Cavour, 19th century Italian Politician and leading figure of Risorgimento.
- Richard Wagner, German composer
- Lewis Hamilton, British Formula One racing driver.
- Gordon Hillman
- Stormzy, British rapper
- Wayne Static
- MJF, American pro wrestler

== See also ==
- List of facial hairstyles
