= Designer stubble =

Short facial hairstyle

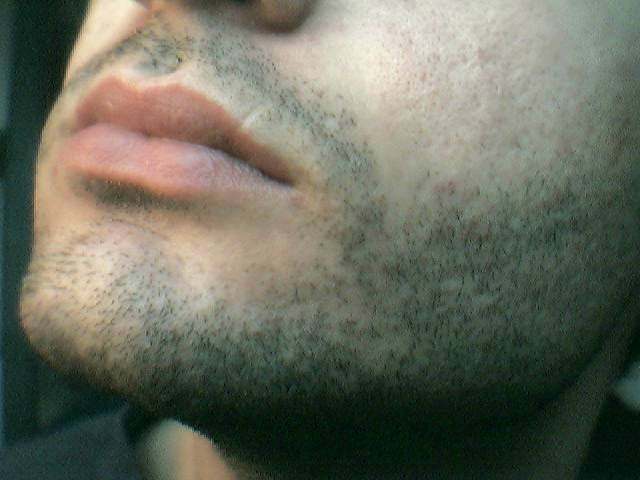
The lower face of a man with designer stubble

Designer stubble is a facial hair style which is a short growth of beard, aimed to affect a rugged masculine or deliberately unkempt appearance. In the late 20th century, it was popularized by singer George Michael and actor Don Johnson. Several companies now manufacture beard trimmers designed specifically to maintain the designer stubble look. Typically created by trimming the beard to a length of 1–3 mm, designer stubble is roughly three days of growth, in contrast with the shorter "five o'clock shadow".

== See also ==
- List of facial hairstyles
