= List of facial hairstyles =

Styles of human facial hair

Simple illustration of various styles of facial hair

This is a non-exhaustive list of facial hairstyles.

== Moustache styles ==
A moustache is defined as any facial hair grown specifically on the upper lip. There are many different types of moustache.

Name	Image	Description
Chevron moustache		A moustache that covers the area between the vermilion border and nose, and extends to the edges of upper lips, but no further.
Dalí moustache		Narrow moustache that points upwards. Named after Salvador Dalí.
English moustache		A wide moustache that gets narrow on the sides, but is mostly straight.
Fu Manchu moustache		A thin, narrow, moustache that grows downward in two very long tendrils from the upper lip, with the tapered, pointed ends hanging past the jawline. It is similar to the horseshoe moustache, but differentiated by the chin and cheeks area being smooth shaven with the lip tendrils overhanging them. The moustache is named after Fu Manchu, a fictional Chinese master-criminal created by Sax Rohmer in 1911, whose portrayal in print and film media established the style.
Handlebar moustache		A moustache which has its ends grown much longer and often flared out, thus resembling Bicycle handlebars. This is usually accentuated by styling the hair with a product such as hair gel or moustache wax. Occasionally, the ends are worn in loops.
Horseshoe moustache		A full moustache with ends that extend down in parallel straight lines beyond the upper lip and down to the jawline. It is similar to the traditional goatee, except for the clean-shaven chin, and resembles a horseshoe or an inverted U. Famous wearers include Hulk Hogan, Paul Teutul Sr., and Chuck Liddell.
Hungarian moustache		Big bushy moustache that extends to the sides. It was used as a category by World Beard and Moustache Championships.
Imperial moustache		A moustache similar to the handlebar, but curls and is generally thicker. It was used as a category by World Beard and Moustache Championships.
Lampshade moustache		A moustache similar to the Pyramid moustache but steeper, thus resembling a trapezoid.
Painter's brush		An intermediate of chevron moustache and pyramid moustache, its top is round, but the bottom is straight.
Pencil moustache		A pencil moustache is a thin line of hair, usually just above the line of the upper lip. It is supposed to look narrow enough to have been drawn on with a pencil (or eyeliner). Often a man wearing a pencil moustache will shave the area above it to accentuate the remaining hair. Similar thin moustaches are sometimes favored by scuba divers because the moustache does not interfere with the diving mask sealing against the skin.
Pornstache		A thick, heavy moustache with slightly elongated ends. The style originates among male pornographic actors in the 1970s and was most popular in the 1980s.
Pyramid moustache		A moustache similar to the chevron moustache but straight instead of curvy, giving a loose resemblance to a triangle.
Toothbrush moustache		This is a narrow but tall moustache which generally does not extend beyond the sides of the nose, and extends to the upper lip. This type of facial hair resembles a small brush like a toothbrush, where the "bristles" are attached to the bottom of the nose. Charlie Chaplin is credited for popularizing this style worldwide in early 20th century. However, subsequent adoption by Adolf Hitler (from 1919 onward) would eventually lead to unpopularity of what would later be known as the "Hitler moustache".
Walrus moustache		The walrus moustache is characterized by whiskers that are thick, bushy, and droop over the mouth. The style resembles the whiskers of a walrus, hence the name.
Zapata moustache		A moustache where the two ends droop downwards towards the jawline, as worn by Mexican Revolutionary Emiliano Zapata. The style was popularized by Marlon Brando in the 1952 semi-biographical film Viva Zapata!.

== Beard styles ==
The simple term beard is an umbrella term which can include any style of facial hair that is not clean shaven or solely a moustache.

=== Goatee styles ===
Name	Image	Description
Anchor beard		Anchor is another variant of t-beard, but unlike the Balbo beard, it's trimmed to resemble an anchor.
Balbo		An extended version of the Van Dyke which wraps around the mouth, with the ends of the moustache (and sometimes also the jawline) flared out beyond the lines that connect to the chin. Named for Italian aviator and Marshal of the Air Force in Fascist Italy Italo Balbo. This style was common among 19th- and early 20th-century German collegiates and military officials.
Goatee		A beard style incorporating hair on the chin but not the cheeks. Traditionally, the term referred to a style including only the hair on the lower jaw around the mouth, but has become a blanket term to refer to any style incorporating hair on the chin but not the cheeks, including those with incorporated moustaches.
Goat patch		Facial hair growing from the chin directly beneath the mouth. This is meant to resemble the hair on the chin of a goat. Also called a "chin puff" or "chin strip".
Soul patch		A soul patch is grown just below the lower lip, but does not grow past the chin (i.e., goat patch). This facial hairstyle is often grown narrow and sometimes made into a spike. The stereotypical image of a 1960s beatnik often includes a soul patch. Howie Mandel (pictured) is a notable modern-day man known for sporting a soul patch.
Van Dyke beard		The Van Dyke style is a type of goatee in which the chin hair is disconnected from the moustache hair. Often the two patches are shaped and styled independently of each other, sometimes with the chin being made into a narrow oval shape and the moustache flared out like a handlebar style. This style is sometimes conflated with the "French beard", which has a fuller chin beard. It is named after the 17th-century Flemish painter Anthony van Dyck.
The Zappa		The Zappa style consists of a wide soul patch and full moustache that extends slightly downward past the corners of the mouth. Named for American musician Frank Zappa.

=== Partial beard styles ===
Name	Image	Description
Chin curtain		A full beard without a moustache or neck hair, sometimes called a "lion's mane."
Chinstrap beard		Sideburns which are connected to each other by a narrow line of hair along the jaw, resembling a helmet strap harnessed to one's chin.
Circle beard		A goatee in which the moustache is allowed to connect to the hair on the chin.
Designer stubble (also called five o'clock shadow)		A stubble is any length of hair which is long enough to be seen, but short enough to not fully cover the skin beneath. This contributes to an image that a man is anywhere between relaxed and casual to disheveled and unclean. The term five-o'clock shadow refers to stubble which is very short, apparently only a few hours' growth (as it would look at 5 PM after a man shaved that morning).
Friendly Mutton Chops		Muttonchops which are connected by a moustache, but no chin hair (which would make it a full beard).
Hulihee		Similar to friendly muttonchops and sidewhiskers but trimmed mustache and sideburns. It originates in Hawaii.
Monkey Tail		A long, curvy tail-like extension and a gap between the beard and moustache only on one side. It is inspired by the curled tail of a primate. A variant is a long curved tail to the center of the chin.
Mutton chops		A more elaborate growth of sideburns which also grow larger toward the chin, resembling a mutton chop (cut of meat with a bone sticking out). An English style that became popular with some in the US by the early 1800s.
Neckbeard		A beard which does not include any hair on the face, but includes the hair of the neck, or under the jaw, or both. Popular in the 19th century, wearers included Jefferson Davis, Joseph Dalton Hooker, Richard Wagner, Henry David Thoreau, Horace Greeley, Horatio Seymour, and Alpheus Felch as well as Emperor Nero of Rome.
Panini (also called Tiger stripe beard)		This beard haircut was inspired by a freshly pressed panini sandwich. It is a beard with shaved horizontal or vertical parallel lines for a striped pattern, wearers include Zac Efron and Vinnie Paul. It is also called a "Tiger stripe beard".
Shenandoah		A fuller version of the chin curtain in which only the moustache is shaved, allowing the hair on the neck to grow out. The Shenandoah style was common in the 19th century in Europe and North America, and is often associated with the Amish community.
Sideburns		Originally known as "Burnsides", sideburns are the patch of hair in front of the ears which connects a beard to the hair of one's head. Any extension beyond a simple corner angle on the front side of the head is considered to be a sideburn, though they can range widely in size from short and neatly cropped to the distinctly massive "muttonchops" of Ambrose Burnside (who gave the term its original name).
Sidewhiskers		Related to sideburns and muttonchops, but considerably more extreme. Classic sidewhiskers hang well below the jawline. They may be connected via a moustache, as in this picture of Chester A. Arthur, but this is not always the case (similar to the situation with standard and friendly mutton chops).
Three pronged beard		The "three pronged beard" has 3 forks that are braided at the lower end.

=== Full-beard styles ===
A full-beard which shows full, unmodified growth on all available areas of the face and neck, including the moustache, chin, sideburns, and cheeks.

Name	Image	Description
Ducktail		A beard where the middle part hangs from chin leaving it pointed. It is set apart from the extended goatee by the inclusion of sideburns.
Dwarven beard		Similar to a Ned Kelly beard, but with a more intricate styling, such as braids. Named for dwarves that are often depicted with the beard in fantasy media.
Forkbeard		A pointed beard that is split by a curl at the chin. Despite also being known as the "French fork", it originates from Iran.
Garibaldi beard		A beard that evenly extends below the chin, but no more than 20 cm. Named after Giuseppe Garibaldi.
Hollywoodian		A full beard that features a goatee, full mustache and horizontal chinstrap with all hairs on the upper cheeks and sideburns removed. It was worn by Guy Williams in the 1963 film Captain Sindbad.
Ned Kelly beard		A beard with the length of more than 20 cm. A Ned Kelly beard is a style of facial hair named after 19th-century Australian bushranger and outlaw Ned Kelly.
Verdi beard		A short beard where the moustache is disconnected from rest of the facial hair. Named after Giuseppe Verdi.

== See also ==
- Beard oil
- Discrimination based on hair texture
- List of hairstyles
- Moustache styles
- Peak beard
- Pigtail Ordinance
