= Soul patch =

Style of facial hair

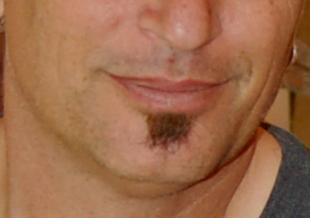
Howie Mandel's soul patch

A soul patch, also known as a mouche, is a small patch of facial hair between the lower lip and the chin.

== 17th-century European fashion ==
Soul patches have been fashionable in Europe at various times in the past, for instance in 17th-century Holland. An example from about 1625 can be seen in the Portrait of a Man in a Wide-Brimmed Hat by Frans Hals. The Merriam-Webster online dictionary dates the earliest known use of the term "soul patch" itself as 1986.

== 1950s and 1960s African-American fashion and imitation by the beatniks ==
Soul patches came to prominence in the 1950s and 1960s, as a style of facial hair common among African-American men, most notably jazz musicians. Frank Zappa is a well-known artist who sported one from the early 1960s on. It became popular with beatniks, artists, and those who frequented the jazz scene and moved in literary and artistic circles. Jazz flutists who disliked the feel of the flute mouthpiece on a freshly shaven lower lip could use a soul patch. On the other hand, jazz trumpeters preferred the goatee for the comfort it provided when using a trumpet mouthpiece.

== 1990s popularization by the film Buffy the Vampire Slayer ==
The soul patch was revived in the early 1990s, partly helped by Luke Perry's Buffy the Vampire Slayer character, Oliver Pike, who wore one. Some prominent athletes adopted soul patches, such as Mike Piazza and Apolo Ohno. The facial hairstyle also rose to prominence in the mall goth and nu-metal scenes around the late 1990s to early 2000s.

== See also ==
- List of facial hairstyles
- Artificial beauty marks, also called mouches
