= Shenandoah (beard) =

Beard style

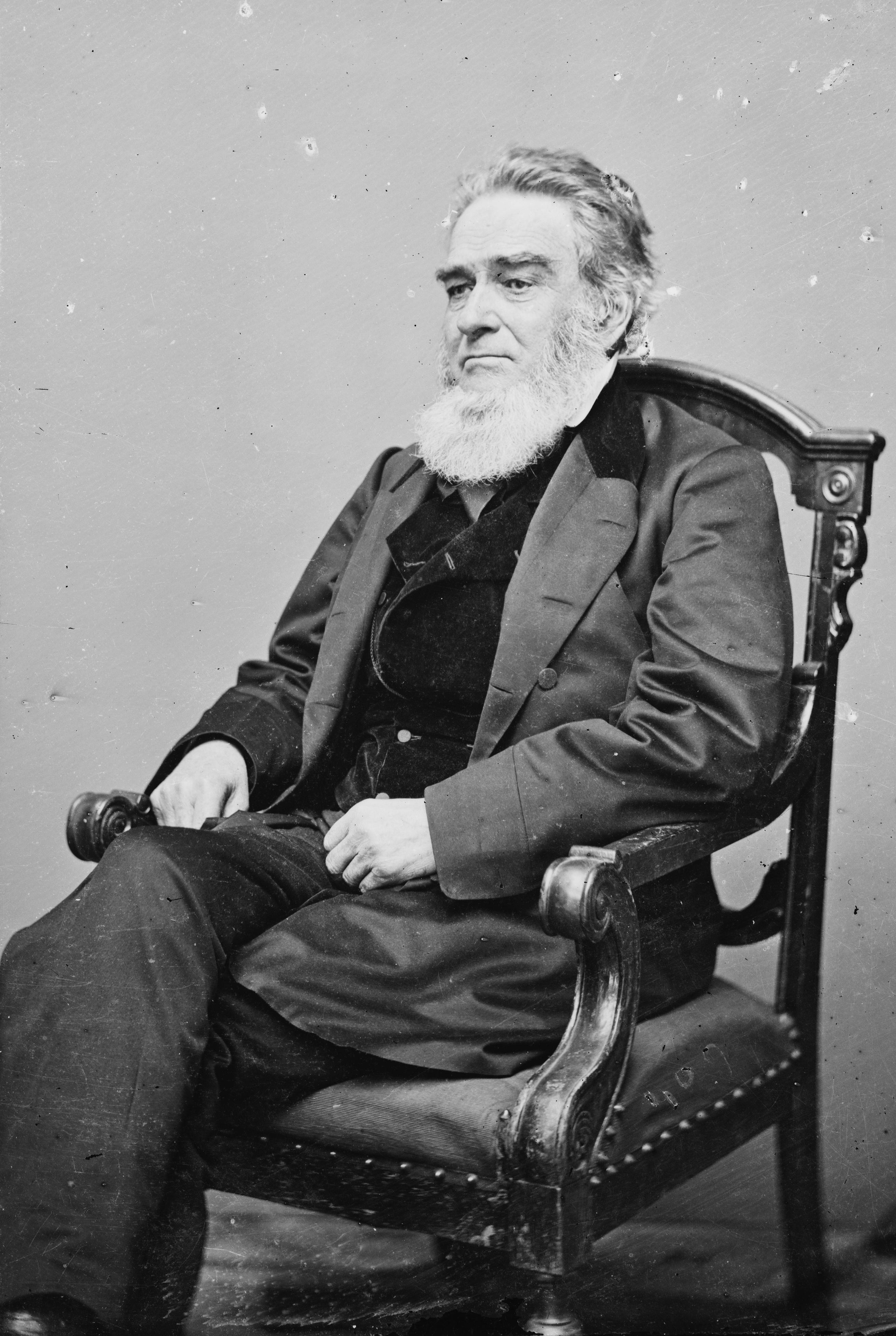
Edward Bates wearing a Shenandoah beard.

A Shenandoah, also known as an Amish beard, a chin curtain, a Donegal, a Dutch beard, a Lincoln, a spade beard, or a whaler, is a style of beard where the hair is grown full and long over the jaw and chin, meeting the sideburns, while the hair above the mouth is shaved.

== Cultural and religious use ==
This facial hair style is popular among followers of certain sects of Islam, particularly Salafi and Wahhabi Sunnis, as they believe it is how the Islamic prophet Muhammad wore his beard. This is based on an interpretation of a hadith compiled by Muhammad al-Bukhari, "Cut the mustaches short and leave the beard". This interpretation is not universally accepted among Muslims; even among those who accept the hadith as encouraging beard-wearing, they dispute the necessity of shaving the mustache completely rather than trimming it short, or of keeping the beard long rather than trimmed.

In the United States, this beard style is common among married Amish men. Male members of the sect generally grow a beard after baptism, but shave the mustache off.

== Gallery ==
Abraham Lincoln wearing a chin curtain beard.

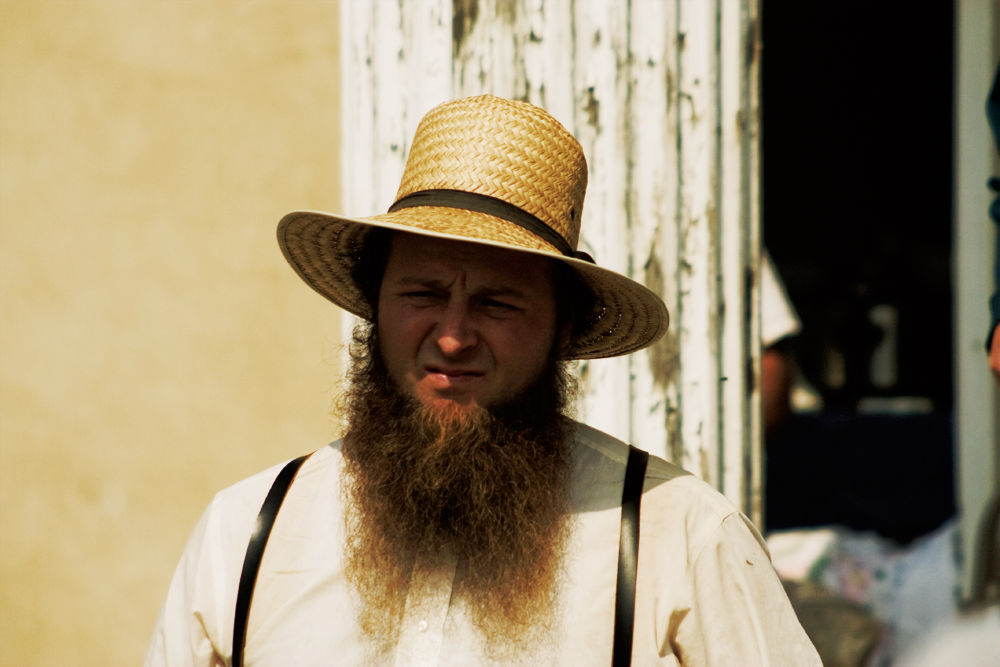
An Amish man with a Shenandoah beard.

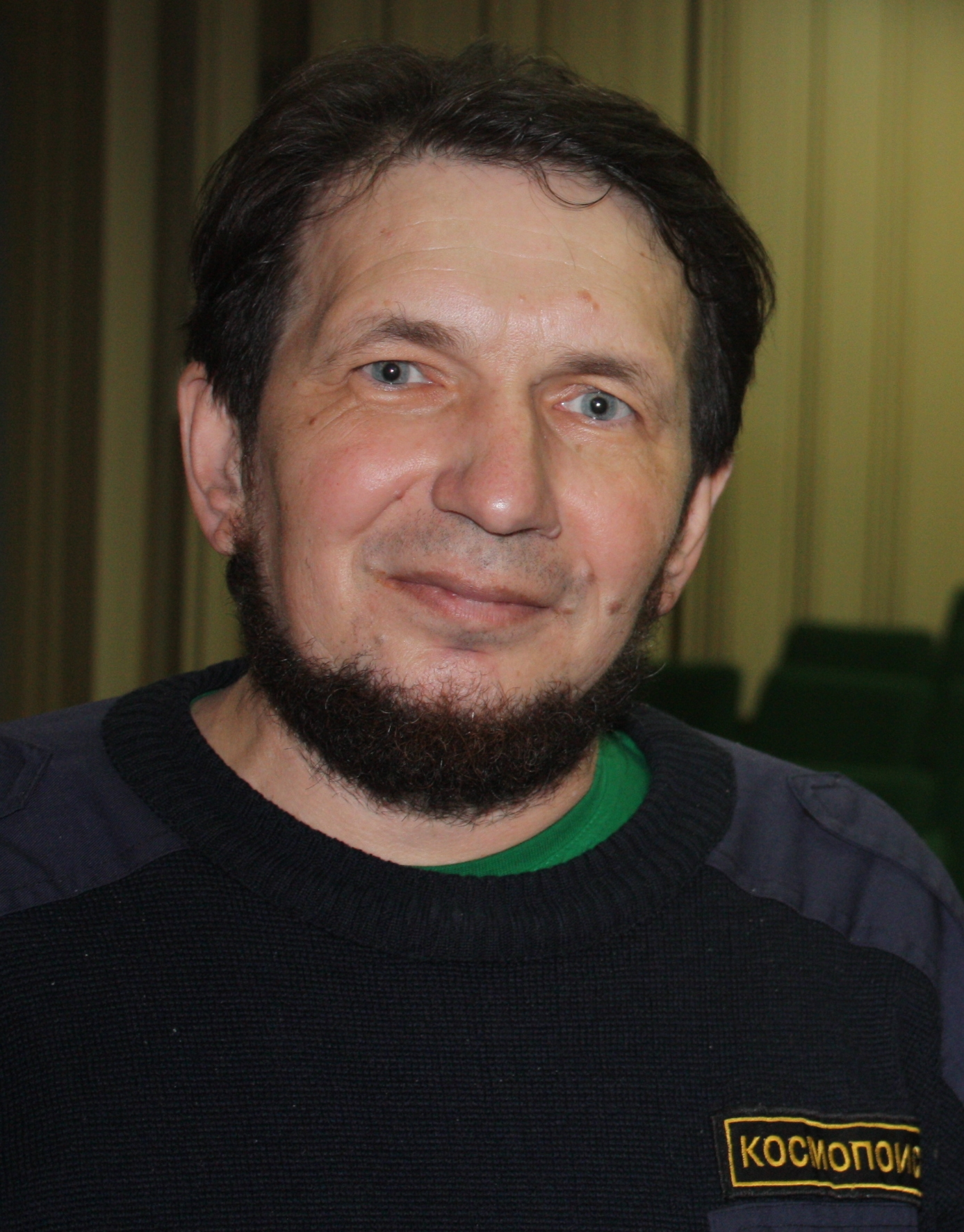
Vadim Chernobrov wearing a shenandoah beard.

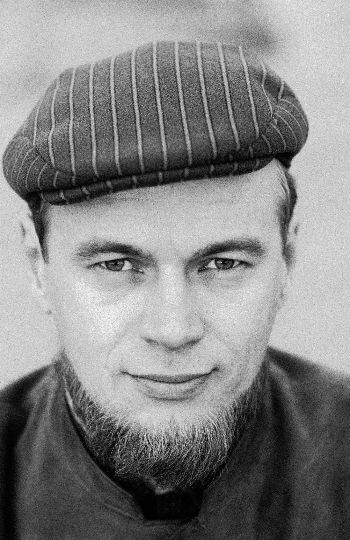
Finnish entertainer Spede Pasanen wearing a shenandoah.

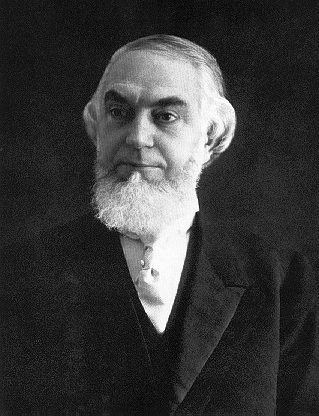
Jehovah's Witnesses founder Charles Taze Russell wearing a Shenandoah

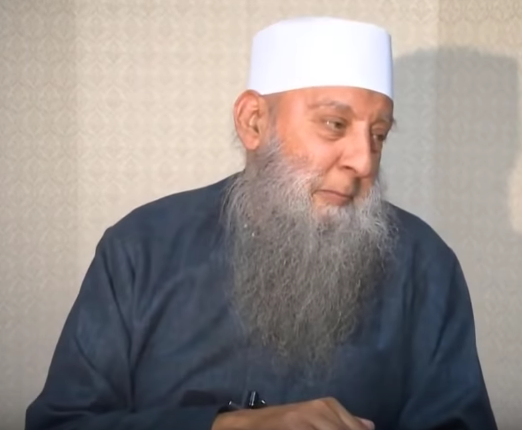
Egyptian preacher Abu Ishaq al-Huwayni wearing a curtain beard and shaved moustache in the Salafi style

== See also ==
- List of facial hairstyles
