= Sideburns =

Patches of facial hair grown on the sides of the face

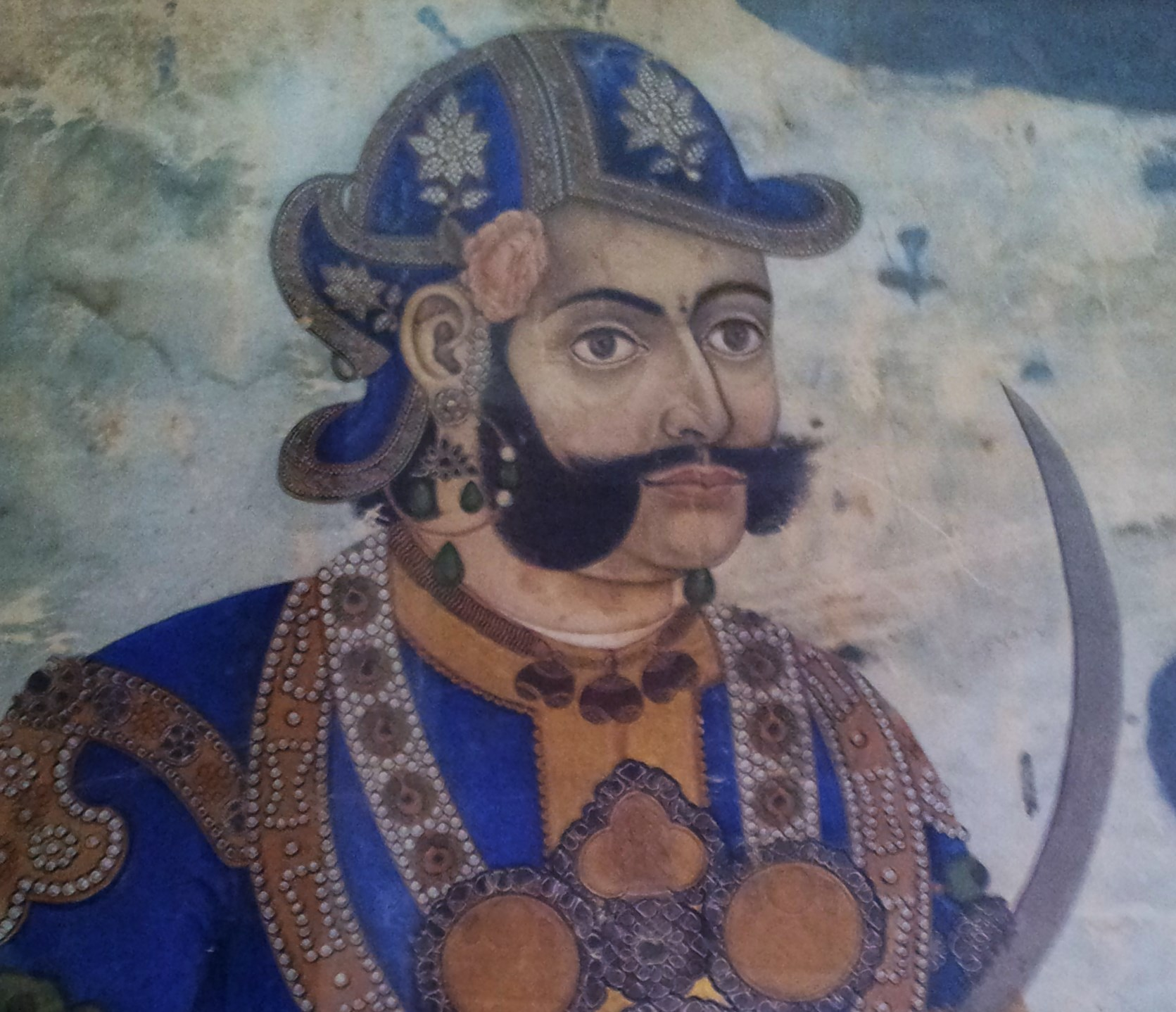
Mathabar Singh Thapa, shown with sideburns of the style worn by Hindu Kshatriya military commanders in the Indian subcontinent.

Sideburns, sideboards, or side whiskers are facial hair grown on the sides of the face, extending from the hairline to run parallel to or beyond the ears. The term sideburns is a 19th-century corruption of the original burnsides, named after American Civil War general Ambrose Burnside, a man known for his unusual facial hairstyle that connected thick sideburns by way of a moustache, but left the chin clean-shaven.

== Variations ==
Variations

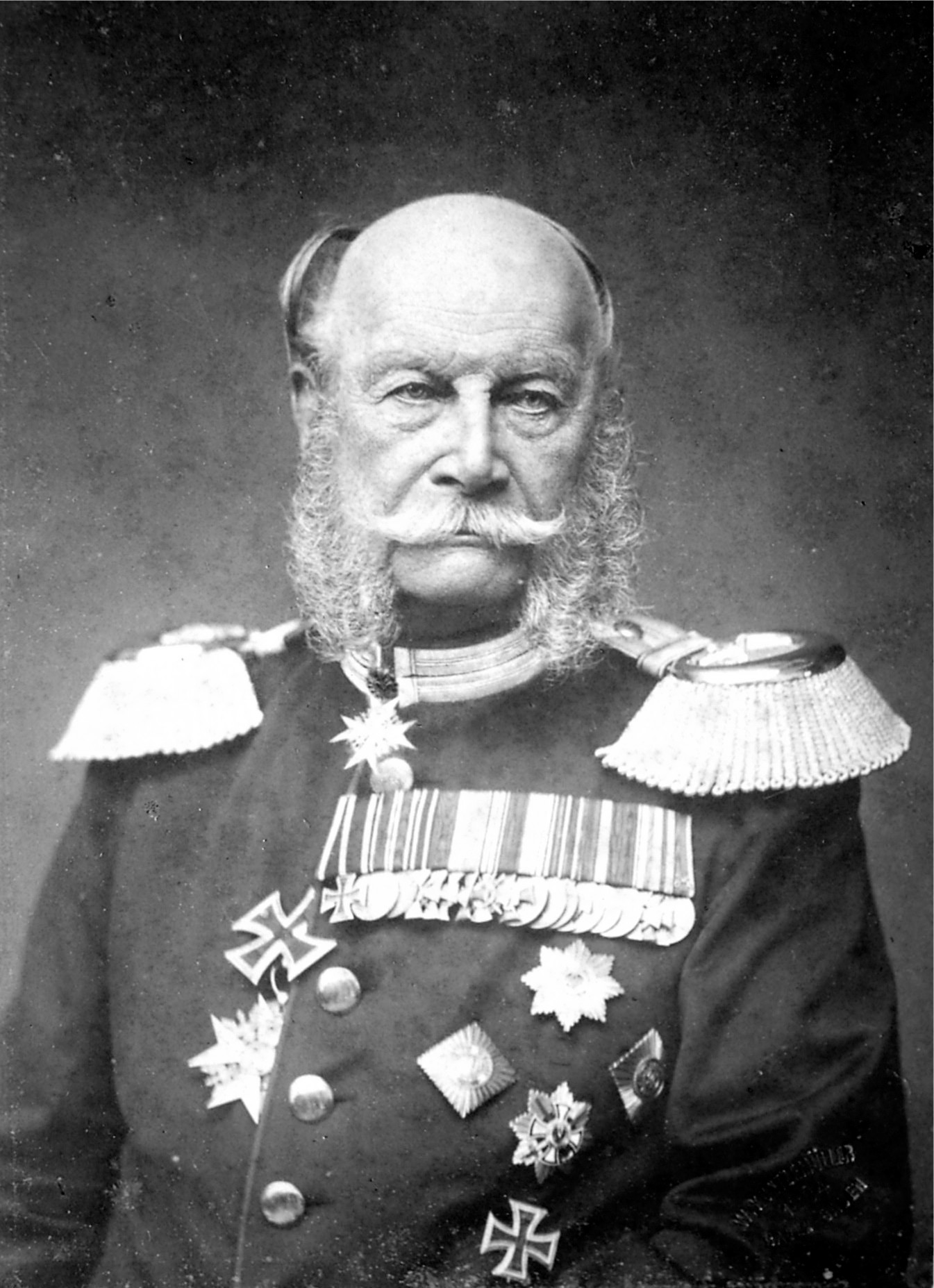
Wilhelm I, German Emperor, sported large sideburns; this style was often referred to as "side whiskers"

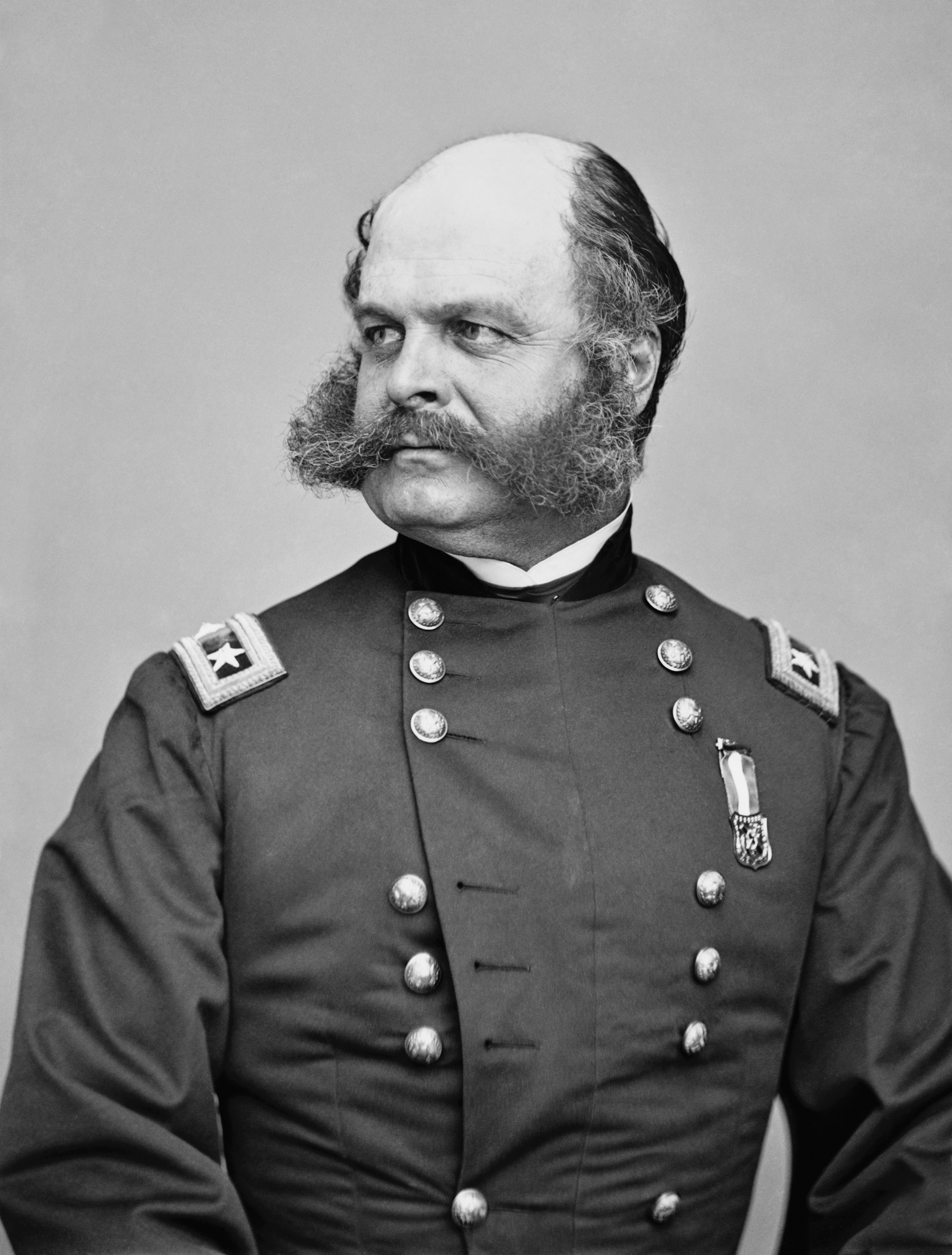
U.S. General Ambrose Burnside, after whom sideburns are named.

Sideburns can be worn and grown in combination with other styles of facial hair, such as the moustache or goatee, but once they extend from ear to ear via the chin they cease to be sideburns and become a beard, chinstrap beard, or chin curtain. Sideburns connected to a moustache along with a clean-shaven chin are known as "friendly mutton chops".

Indigenous men of Colombia and Mexico, including Aztecs, shaved their heads and wore their braided sideburns long, said to be wearing "balcarrotas", rarely seen in modern times, but prized in the 16th century as a mark of virile vanity and banned by the colonial authorities in New Spain, resulting in rioting in 1692.

== History ==
Sideburns are present on statues and masks of Romans dating back to the 1st Century. Elagabalus is depicted with sideburns and a mustache.

Following the fashion in Europe young South American criollos adopted sideburns. Many of the independence heroes of South America, including José de San Martín, Manuel Belgrano, Antonio José de Sucre, Bernardo O'Higgins, José Miguel Carrera, and Antonio Nariño had sideburns and are as such depicted on numerous paintings, coins and banknotes.

19th century examples

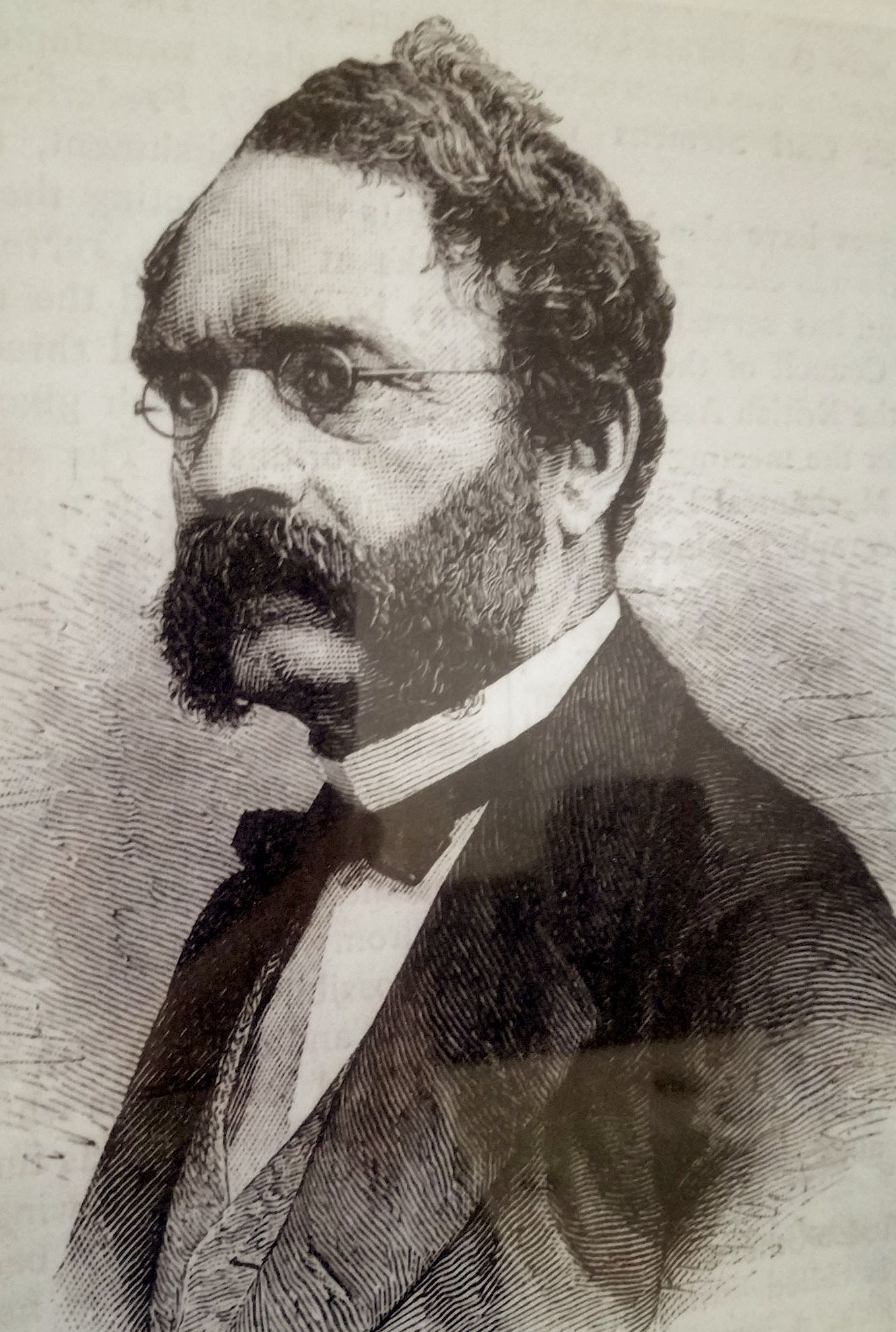
German inventor Werner von Siemens (1816–1892)

Georgian lexicographer David Chubinashvili with "mutton-chops"

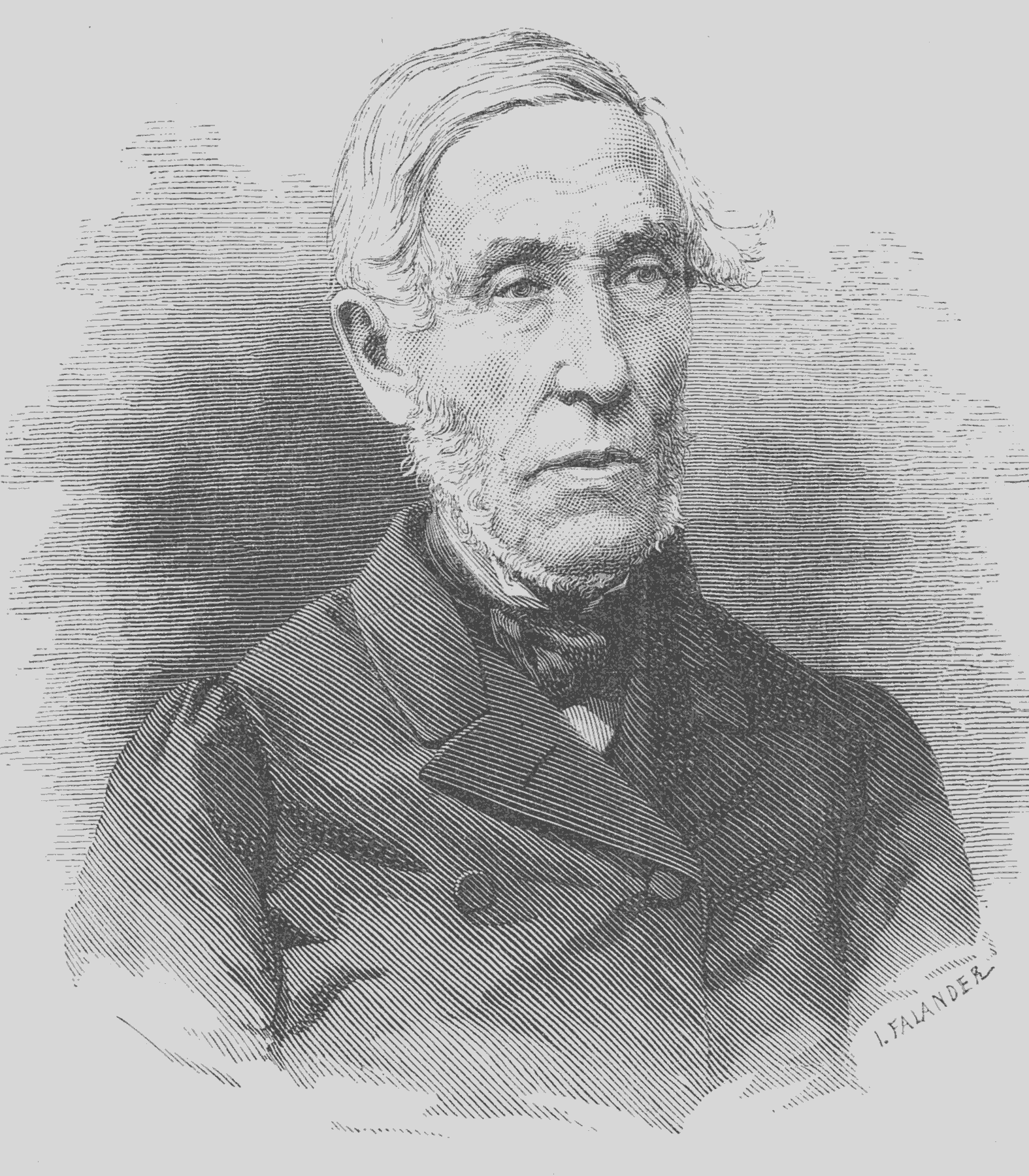
Relatively short sideburns on J. V. Snellman (1806–1881), a Finnish philosopher and statesman

Nineteenth-century sideburns were often far more extravagant than those seen today, similar to what are now called mutton chops, but considerably more extreme. In period literature, "side whiskers" usually refers to this style, in which the whiskers hang well below the jaw line. As with beards, sideburns went quickly out of fashion in the early twentieth century. In World War I, in order to secure a seal on a gas mask, men had to be clean-shaven; this did not affect mustaches.

20th century examples

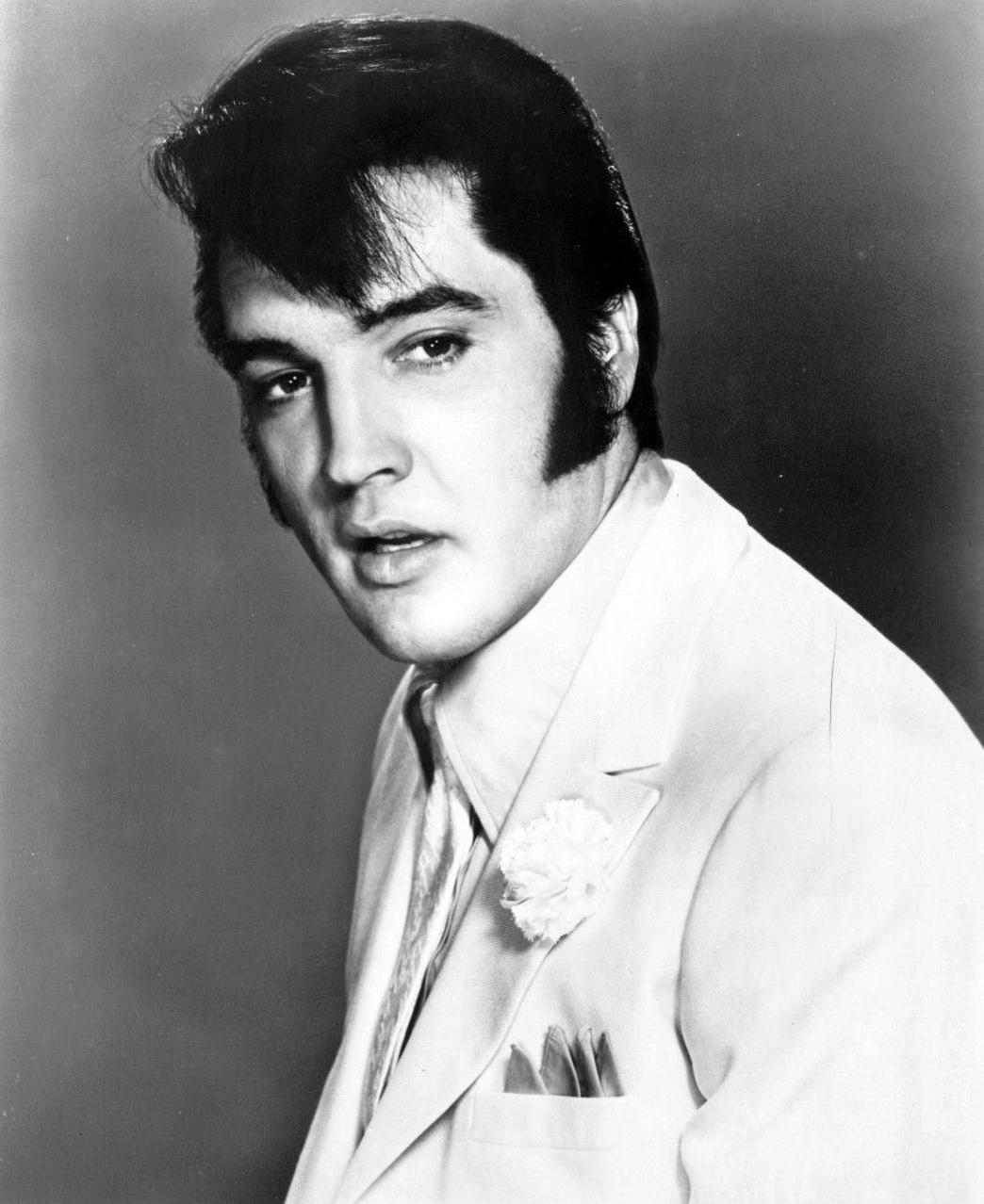
Elvis Presley

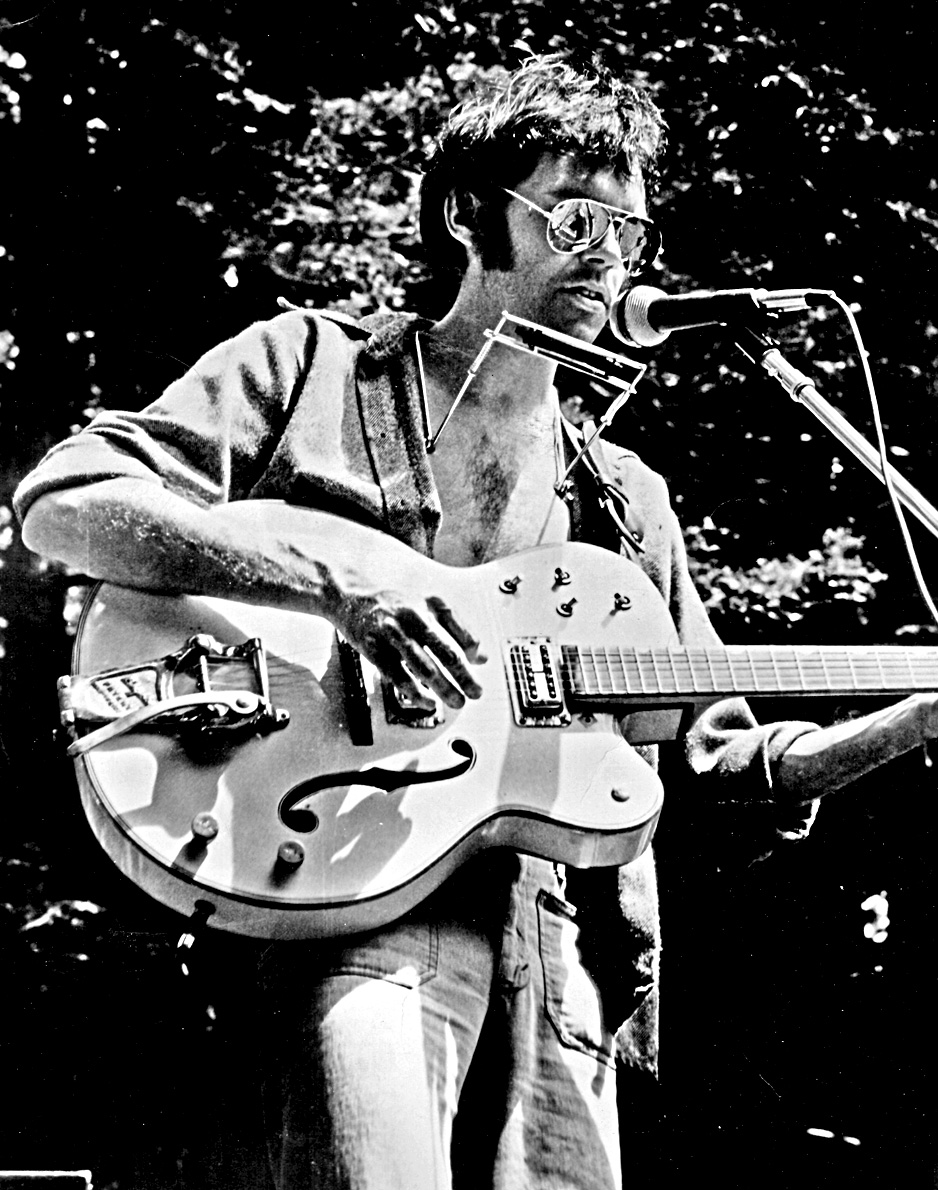
Neil Young

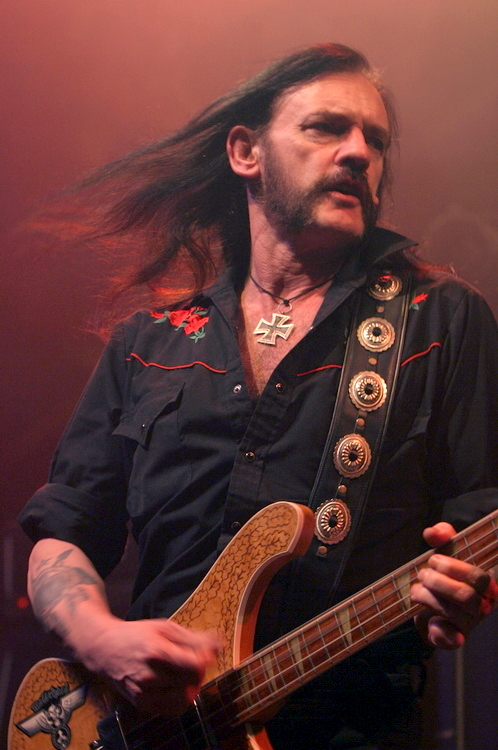
Lemmy

In 1936, President Franklin Roosevelt briefly experimented with sideburns on a yachting cruise, provoking laughter from wife Eleanor. Sideburns made a comeback in the mid-1950s when Marlon Brando sported them as the title character in The Wild One (1953). Further spurred by Elvis Presley, sideburns were sported by "hoods", "greasers", and "rockers" seeking to highlight their rebellious post-pubescent manliness. Sideburns later gained popularity in the counterculture of the 1960s: the struggle of a New Jersey youth to wear sideburns to his public high school graduation made a newspaper article in 1967. Sideburns were associated with young mods and hippies, but in the '70s became prevalent in all walks of life. "Lambchop" sideburns also became a symbol of the gay club scenes of San Francisco and Sydney, as did the handlebar mustache. For the most part, sideburns have never gone out of fashion. They have continued to be popular among rock musicians, and even become a notable feature of such musicians like Stephen Stills, Neil Young, George Jones, and Lemmy.

Notable 21st century examples include Emmanuel Macron (though his are short), Javier Milei, Cem Özdemir, Viktor Yushchenko, David Pountney, Adam Sandler, John Lithgow, Mike Dirnt and David Tennant.

21st century examples

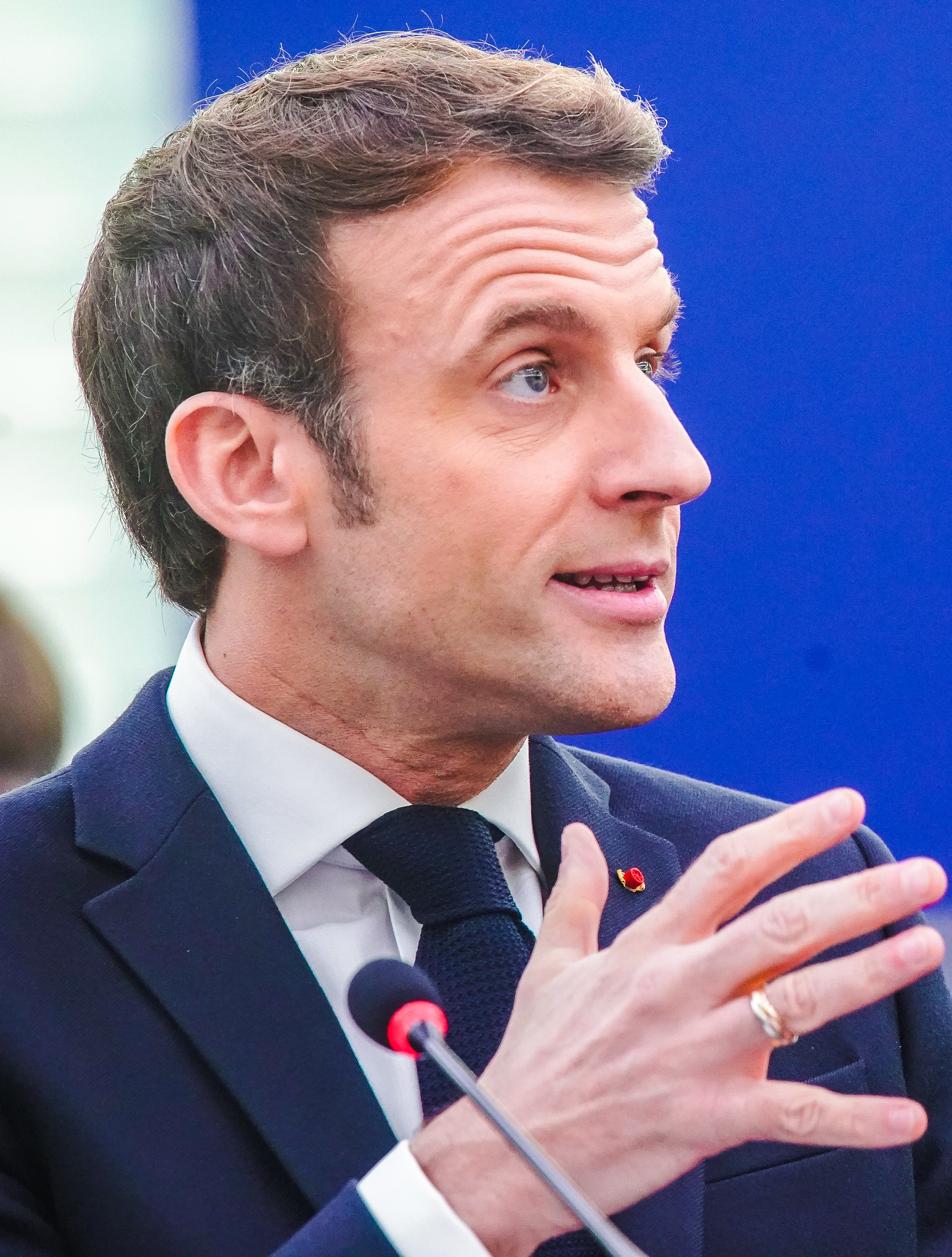
Emmanuel Macron

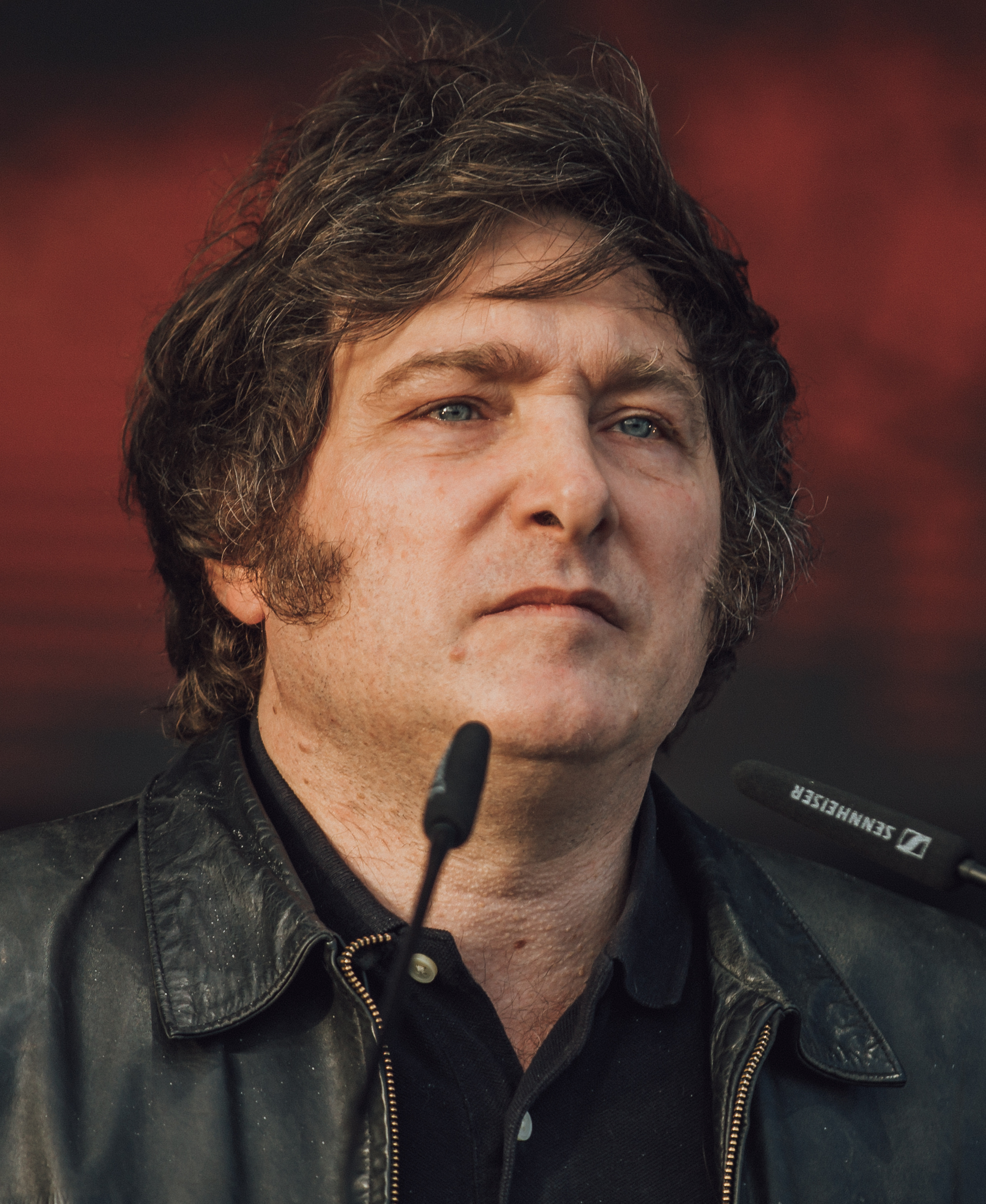
Javier Milei

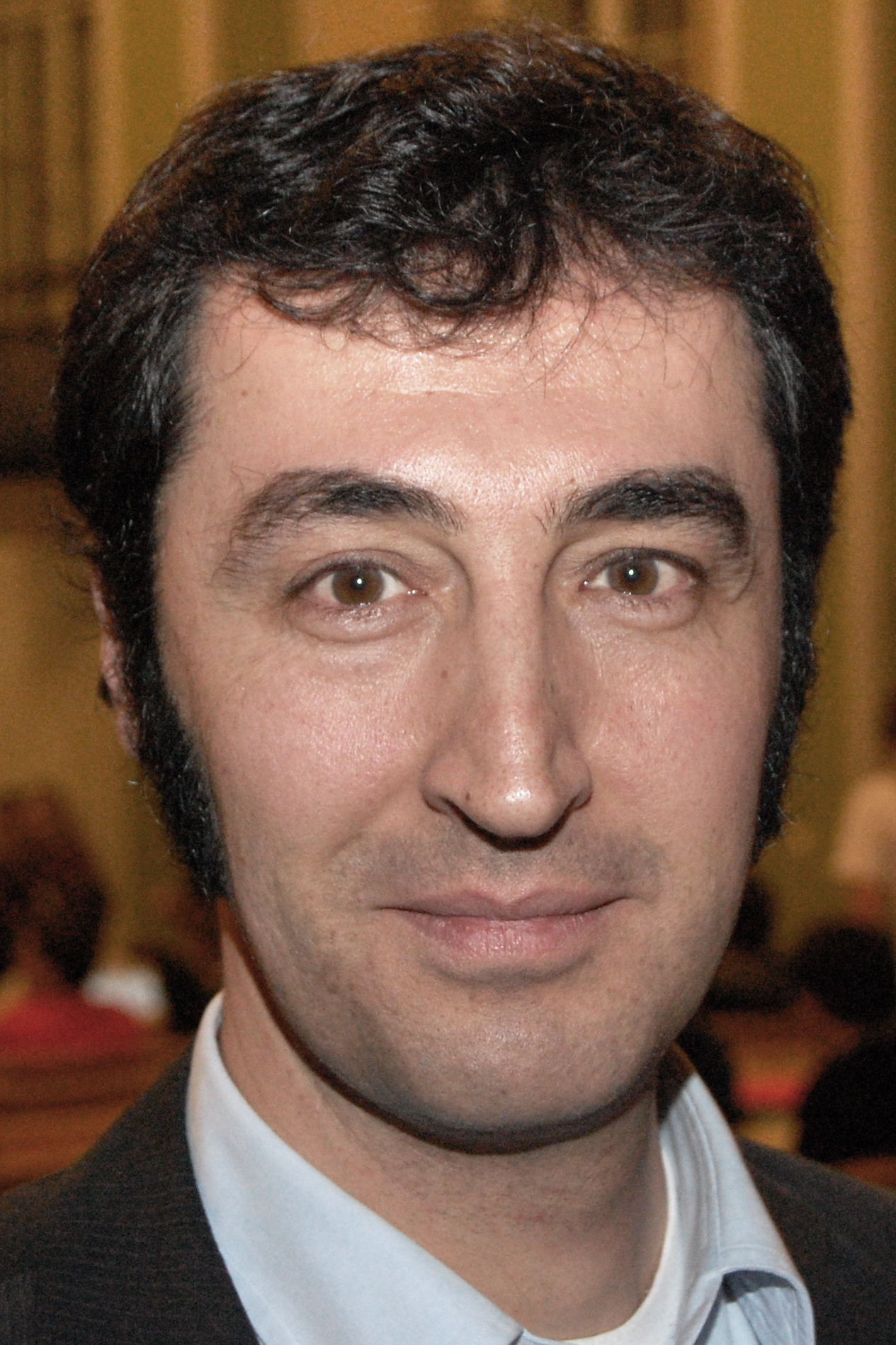
Cem Özdemir

Because of sideburns' multifarious history, they may be seen as stuffily Victorian; an indicator of roughness, vice, or rebelliousness; a characteristic of rock 'n' roll; or merely a retro fashion revival.

== See also ==
- List of facial hairstyles
- Payot
- Stubble
