= Charles Nettleton =

Australian photographer

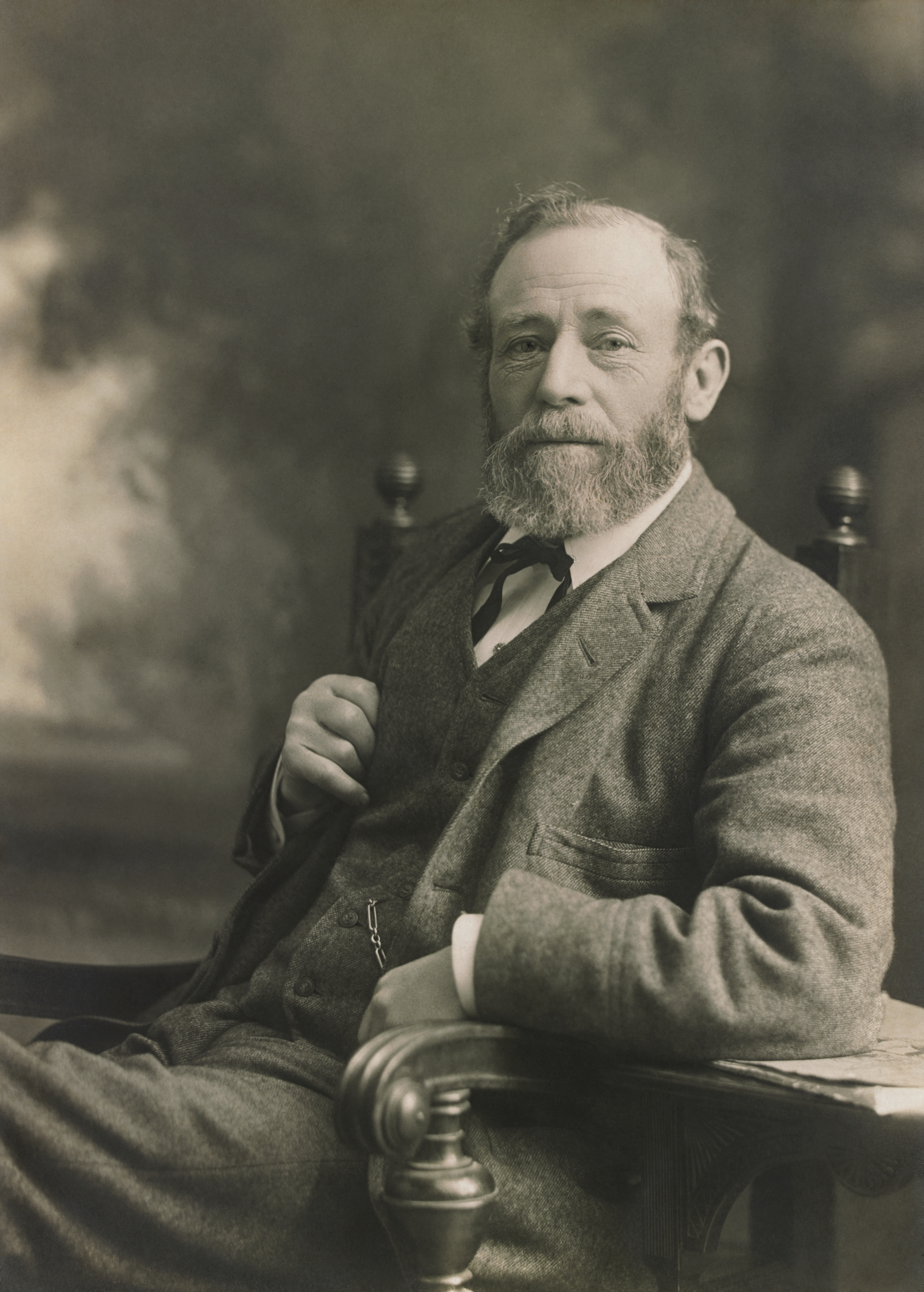
- Nettleton in the mid-to-late 1890s by Talma & Co.
- Born: 1826; England
- Died: 1902 (aged 75–76); Melbourne, Victoria, Australia
- Occupation: Photographer

Charles Nettleton (1826–1902) was an Australian photographer who worked in Victoria. He used the wet plate process throughout his career.

== Early life ==
Nettleton was born in Northern England in 1826, son to George Nettleton. In 1854, looking for a change of weather or scenery, he moved to Victoria with his wife Emma (née Miles). Together they had seven daughters and three sons.

== Career ==
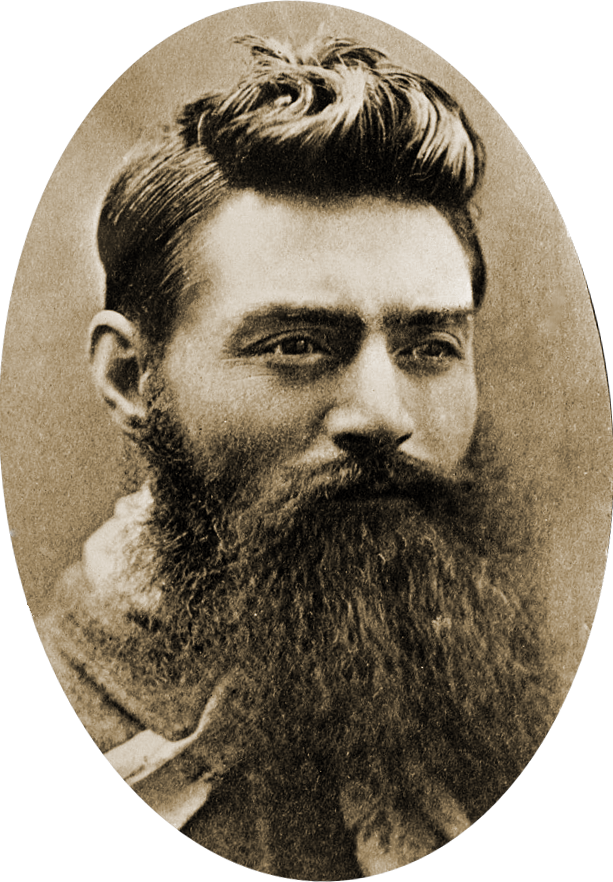
Nettleton's famous portrait of Ned Kelly, taken the day before the bushranger's execution

After Nettleton arrived in Victoria in 1854 he was employed at the photographic studio of Duryea and McDonald. On 12 September 1854, Nettleton photographed the first steam train journey in Australia, between Melbourne and Sandridge (later Port Melbourne).

As a result of capturing that landmark event, Nettleton was invited by the Victorian Government to photograph the development of the railway system in Victoria. He was also employed by the City of Melbourne. In those roles, he recorded the spectacular growth of Melbourne over 35 years, photographing many of the major public works of the time, including the water supply system, bridges, roads and wharves, and the diversion of the Yarra River. He also photographed major buildings: the Melbourne Town Hall, the Victorian Houses of Parliament, the Treasury Building, the Royal Mint, the Law Courts, and the Melbourne Post Office. Theatres, churches, schools, banks, hospitals and markets were also captured by his camera, as well as ships such as the Cutty Sark and the American Confederate commerce raider Shenandoah.

In 1858, Nettleton opened his own studio, after which he attempted portrait photographs, but due to their poor quality, he decided to concentrate on his views of Melbourne and environs.

Nettleton photographed soldiers being sent to the New Zealand Wars in 1860. In 1861, he was allowed to board the SS Great Britain to photograph the first English cricket team to arrive in Australia. He photographed the volunteer artillery camp at Sunbury in 1866, and in 1867, he was appointed the official photographer during the Victorian visit of the Duke of Edinburgh.

In the 1860s, he became a police photographer and worked for 25 years in that department, finishing his duty in the 1880s. In 1880, he took a photographic portrait of Ned Kelly, the famous Australian bushranger and outlaw, the day before his execution.

In 1868, Nettleton published the first souvenir albums of that type for public sale in Australia. One album consisted of 12 views of Melbourne. Nettleton designed large album prints of his views of shipping in the mid to late 1880s. He also captured views of Queen's Wharf in Melbourne, "The Drops" at the Coliban waterworks, and the waterworks at Geelong, Malmsbury and Yean Yean. Because photo-mechanical printing processes were rare at the time, all of Nettleton's albums are prints of his actual photographs. These albums can now be found in the collections of libraries and museums throughout Australia.

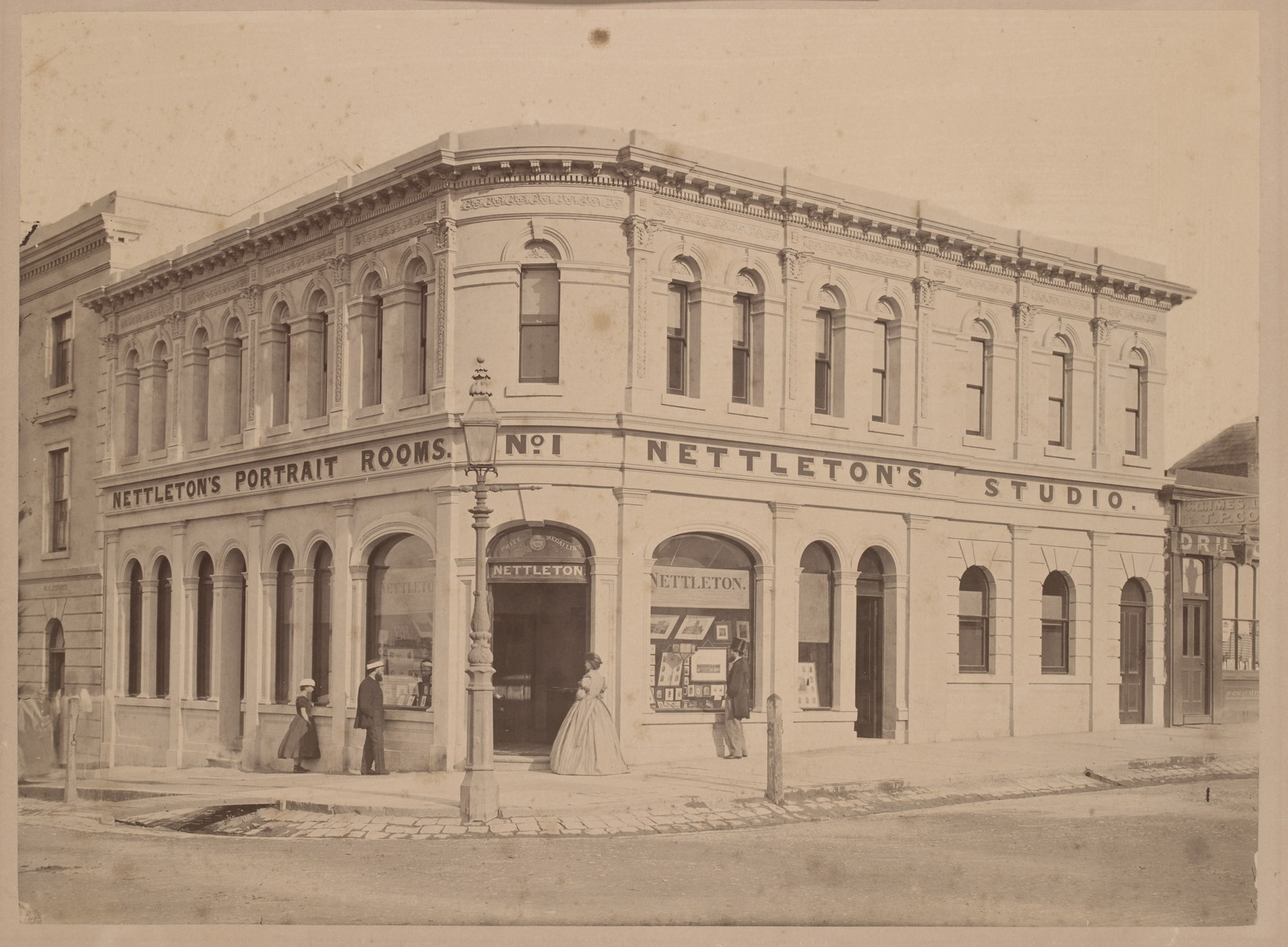
Nettleton's Portrait Rooms and Studio, 1 Madeline Street, Carlton (ca. 1870) State Library Victoria H5199

In 1890, Nettleton decided to close his studio and retire, because of the introduction of dry plate photography, which he did not embrace. In his later years, he became a member of the Collingwood Lodge of Freemasons, and was a match-winning player for the West Melbourne Lawn Bowls Club.

== Exhibitions ==
In the 1860s, Nettleton was becoming well known as a photographer, and he created photograph albums which were shown in a number of exhibitions. His first successful exhibition was held in London in 1862. Other exhibitions took place in Dublin in 1865 and Paris in 1867. In 1879, his final exhibition was in his home country, in a Sydney Exhibition.

Nettleton's prints were generally of two sizes: 8 in × 6 in (200 mm × 150 mm) and 15 in × 12 in (380 mm × 300 mm).

== Techniques ==
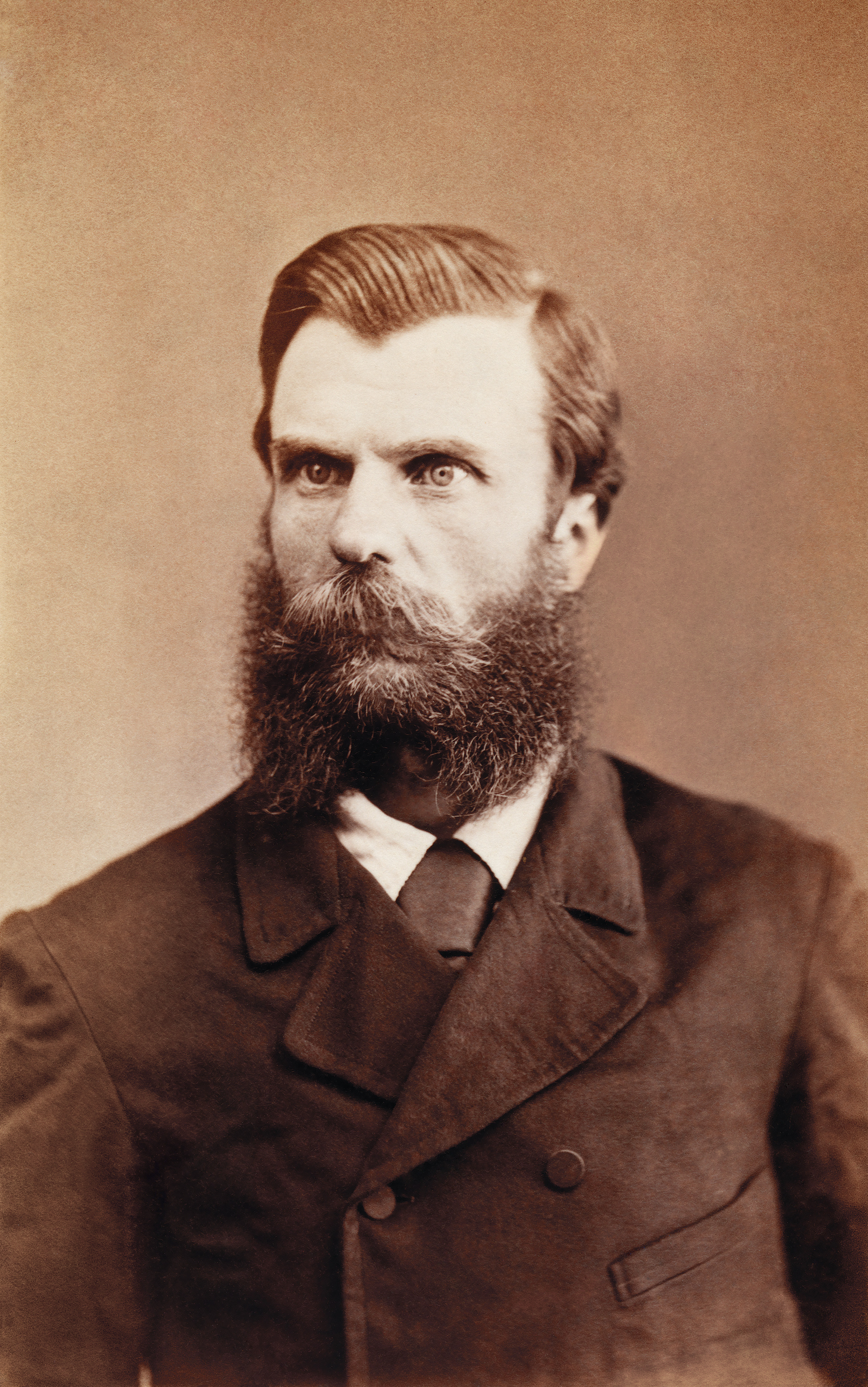
Portrait of Captain Moonlite attributed to Nettleton, circa 1879.

Nettleton used the wet plate process for his images, also known as the collodion process. The simpler dry plate process was being increasingly adopted by the mid-1880s. The new technique adversely affected Nettleton's business using the wet plate process, and he eventually decided to retire.

Nettleton knew how to capture a photograph professionally. Gael Newton argues that he was able to adjust complicating structures with his understanding of depth of field, creating very clear detail. He liked going to high points so he could take panoramic views. One of his panoramas was used as the basis for a lithograph by the firm of De Gruchy and Leigh.

Nettleton's skill was displayed in the sharp delineation in his photos taken at six seconds exposure. Using that technique he was able to photograph soldiers and horses involved in the New Zealand Wars and capture them as still photographs.
