= Facial hair =

Hair grown on the face, chin, cheeks, and upper lip region

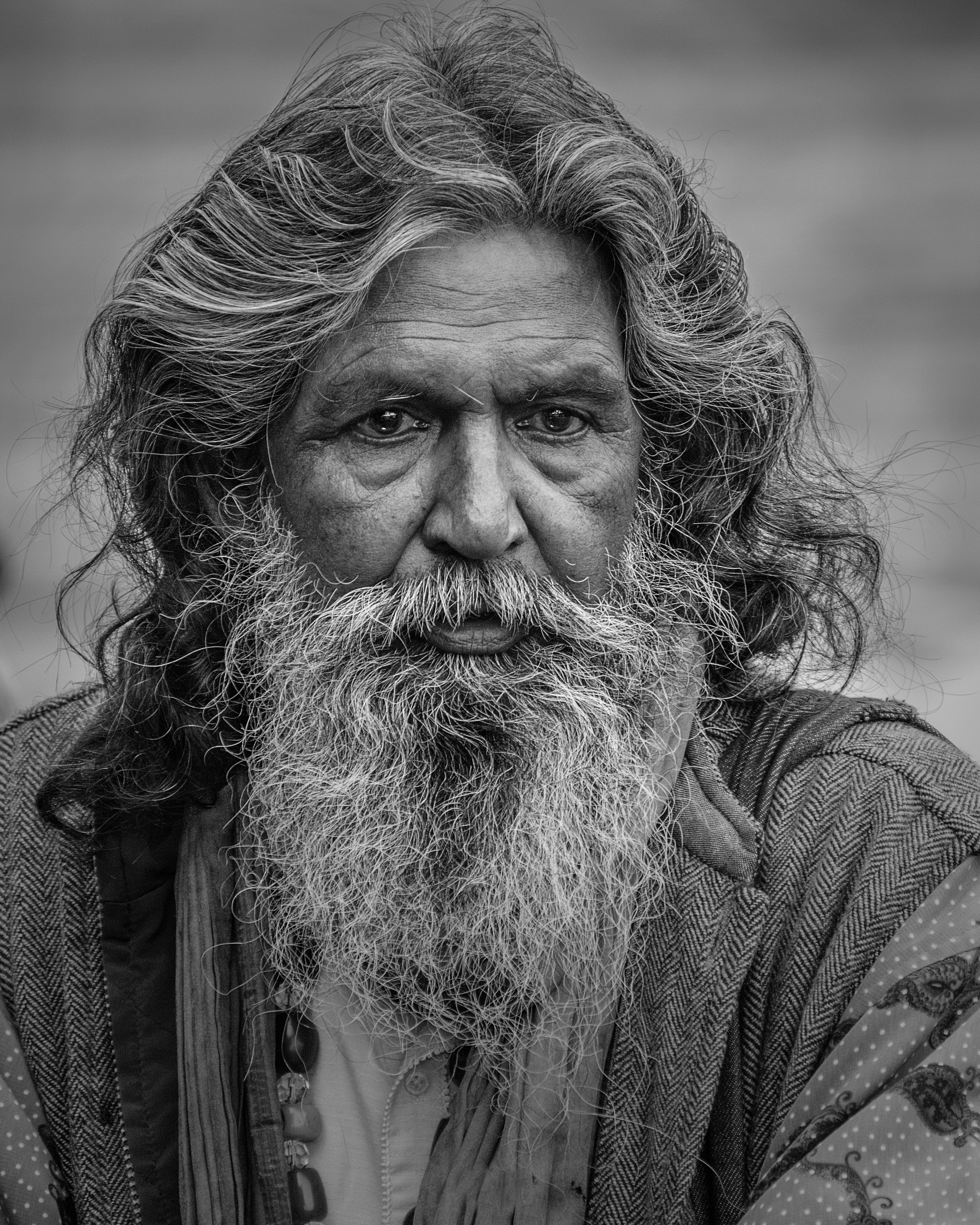
A man with a full beard

Facial hair is hair grown on the face, usually on the chin, cheeks, bottom lip and upper lip region. It is typically a secondary sex characteristic of human males. Men typically start developing facial hair in the later stages of puberty or adolescence, at around 14 years of age, and most do not finish developing a full adult beard until around age 16 or later. However, large variations can occur; boys as young as 10 have also been known to develop facial hair, and some men do not produce much facial hair at all.

Men may style their facial hair into beards, moustaches, goatees or sideburns; others may completely shave their facial hair, which is referred to as being "clean-shaven". The term whiskers, when used to refer to human facial hair, indicates the hair on the chin and cheeks.

Women are also capable of developing facial hair, especially after menopause, though typically significantly less than men. Women with significant facial hair, in particular bearded ladies, have traditionally been regarded as freaks by society, and sometimes participated in circuses.

Transgender men undergoing masculinizing hormone therapy typically develop larger amounts of facial hair as part of their overall gender transition.

== History ==
The prevalence and popularity of facial hair in Western societies and culture has shifted back and forth consistently over the centuries. During the mid to late nineteenth century for instance, following the widely clean-shaven eighteenth century, most men maintained some facial hair. According to a 1976 study by University of Washington economist Dwight Robinson, who reviewed illustrations in the Illustrated London News, facial hair peaked in the 1880s (90%). The wearing of beards dropped significantly, although mustaches remained popular until the 1940s.

== In male adolescence ==
Abraham Lincoln is said to have grown his beard on the recommendation of the 11-year-old Grace Bedell.

The moustache forms its own stage in the development of facial hair in adolescent males. Facial hair in males does not always appear in a specific order during puberty and varies but may follow this process.

- During puberty, the first facial hair to appear tends to grow at the corners of the upper lip (age 10–14).
- It then spreads to form a moustache over the entire upper lip (age 14–16).
- This is followed by the appearance of hair on the upper part of the cheeks and the area under the lower lip (age 14–17).
- It eventually spreads to the sides and lower border of the chin and the rest of the lower face to form a full beard (age 16–19).

Although this order is commonly seen, it can vary widely, with some facial hair starting from the chin and up towards the sideburns. As with most human biological processes, this specific order may vary depending on one's genetic heritage or environment.

== Military ==
Depending on the periods and countries, facial hair has been prohibited in armies or, on the contrary, an integral part of the uniform.

== In religion ==
Many religious male figures are recorded to have had facial hair; for example, numerous prophets mentioned in the Abrahamic religions (Judaism, Christianity and Islam) were known to grow beards. In Shia Islam, trimming beards is allowed but shaving them is forbidden. Amish men grow beards after marriage but continue to shave their moustaches in order to avoid historical associations with military facial hair due to their pacifistic beliefs. In Sikhism, one of the Five Ks followed by Khalsa Sikhs is kesh, which forbids the cutting or shaving of hair, both scalp and facial.

== On women ==
Women typically have little hair on the face, apart from eyebrows and the vellus hair that covers most of the body. However, in some cases, women have noticeable facial hair growth, most commonly after menopause. Excessive hairiness (especially facially) is known as hirsutism and is usually an indication of atypical hormonal variation. Many women depilate facial hair that appears, as considerable social stigma is associated with facial hair on women, and freak shows and circuses have historically displayed bearded women. Many women globally choose to totally remove their facial hair by means of electrolysis (permanent) or laser hair removal (semi-permanent).

== Primates ==
Primates such as the bearded emperor tamarin have what look like whiskers. Adult orangutans have varying degrees of facial hair. In chimpanzees and gorillas, facial and body hair become sparser in adulthood due to the aging process, which is in stark contrast to humans, whose facial and body hair become stronger. Because infant great apes have thicker "facial" (as well as body) hair than their older counterparts, it is not androgenic but part of the fur complex. The sensitivity to androgens seems to have been acquired by humans on the gene KRT37 relatively recently.

== See also ==
- Eyebrow
- Whiskers
- List of presidents of the United States with facial hair
