= Mansome =

- Directed by: Morgan Spurlock
- Produced by: Ben Silverman; Will Arnett; Jason Bateman
- Starring: Morgan Spurlock; Will Arnett; Jason Bateman; Adam Carolla; Paul Rudd; Zach Galifianakis
- Production companies: Paladin; Dumbdumb; Electus; Warrior Poets
- Distributed by: MPI Home Video
- Release date: April 21, 2012 (Tribeca Film Festival)
- Running time: 84 minutes
- Country: United States
- Language: English
- Box office: $18,395

Mansome is a 2012 documentary film directed by Morgan Spurlock, and executive-produced by actors/comedians Will Arnett and Jason Bateman, and Electus founder Ben Silverman.

== Themes ==
Mansome looks at male identity as it is expressed through grooming methods.

== Definition of mansome ==
The term mansome is a neologism in popular culture. The documentary Mansome attempts to clarify exactly what makes a man "mansome".

== To groom or not to groom ==
The film follows three men (in addition to Spurlock), each with completely different opinions on facial hair and the act of grooming.

- Jack Passion is viewed by some as America's greatest beardsman, and is the only American to ever win first place at the German Beard and Moustache Championships. He is also a multiple world champion in the “Natural Full Beard” category. In Mansome, Passion expresses his belief that a man's natural state is to be bearded, and therefore should be embraced. He even goes so far as to say that those who are clean-shaven are stuck in perpetual boyhood.
- In contrast, Ricky Manchanda is a fashion buyer who believes that proper grooming includes being clean-shaven and perfect. He gets his eyebrows threaded, is a proponent for moisturizing to avoid dry skin and wrinkles, and takes approximately an hour and a half to get ready in the morning.
- Shawn Daivari, a pro wrestler, portrays the extreme grooming requirements imposed by his profession.

== Reception ==
On review aggregation website Rotten Tomatoes, the film has a rating of 25% based on reviews from 36 critics, with an average rating of 4.7 out of 10. On Metacritic, the film has a score of 35 out of 100, based on reviews from 14 critics indicating "Generally unfavorable reviews".

The Chicago Sun-Times reviewer Richard Roeper gave the film three stars, calling it "a typically whimsical documentary". He noted that "there's a certain late-to-the-party aspect to Mansome, as if Spurlock has just discovered the metrosexual trend of what, 15 years ago?". Owen Gleiberman of Entertainment Weekly gave the film a positive review and a grade of B+. Gleiberman enjoys how the film both celebrates and laughs "all the ways they can be vain and even inane" and calls it a "funny, incisive talking-head commentary".

The staff of The A.V. Club named it one of the worst movies of 2012, criticizing it as "absolutely insufferable, a shabby excuse for a documentary that sadistically stretches to feature length a premise that would barely support a two-minute short".
