= Jack Passion =

American author and musician (born 1983)

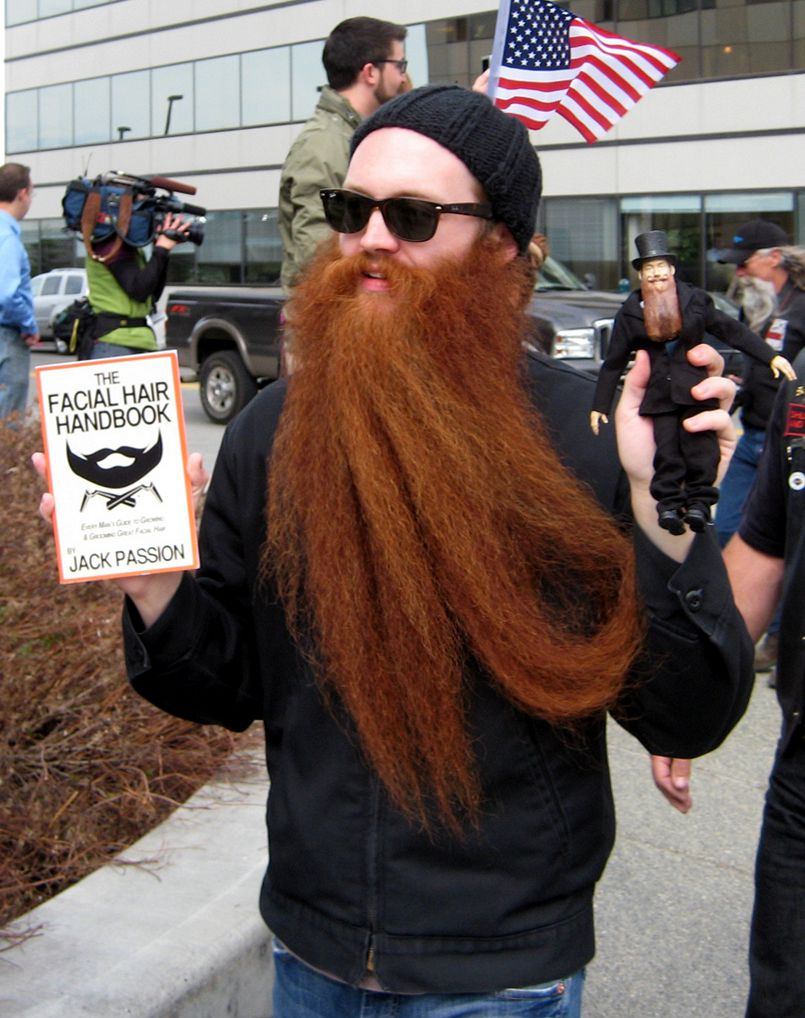
Jack Passion at the WBMC 2009 in Anchorage, Alaska

Jack Passion (John Giles) is an American rock musician, author, and entrepreneur. He was the principal focus of the IFC television series Whisker Wars.

He is a multiple world champion in the "Full Beard Natural" category. His initial win was in 2007 at the World Beard and Moustache Championships held in Brighton, England, at the age of 23. He successfully defended his title in the 2009 Championships (Anchorage, Alaska), where he also was the Second Place Overall Champion. However, he was dethroned in the 2011 Championships (Trondheim, Norway), where he placed second to fellow American Rooty Lundvall. Passion is the author of The Facial Hair Handbook as well as the ESPN article Breaking: World Beard Champion Talks NHL Playoff Beards.

Passion was one of the featured guests in the 2012 Morgan Spurlock film Mansome, offering insight into the world of competitive facial hair. His final appearance in a beard competition took place at the 2012 International German Beard Championships in Bad Schussenried, Germany, where he placed second.

He lives in Los Angeles. Passion has retired from professional beard competitions and has trimmed his beard to a conventional length.
