= Shawn Daivari =

Iranian-American professional wrestler (born 1984)

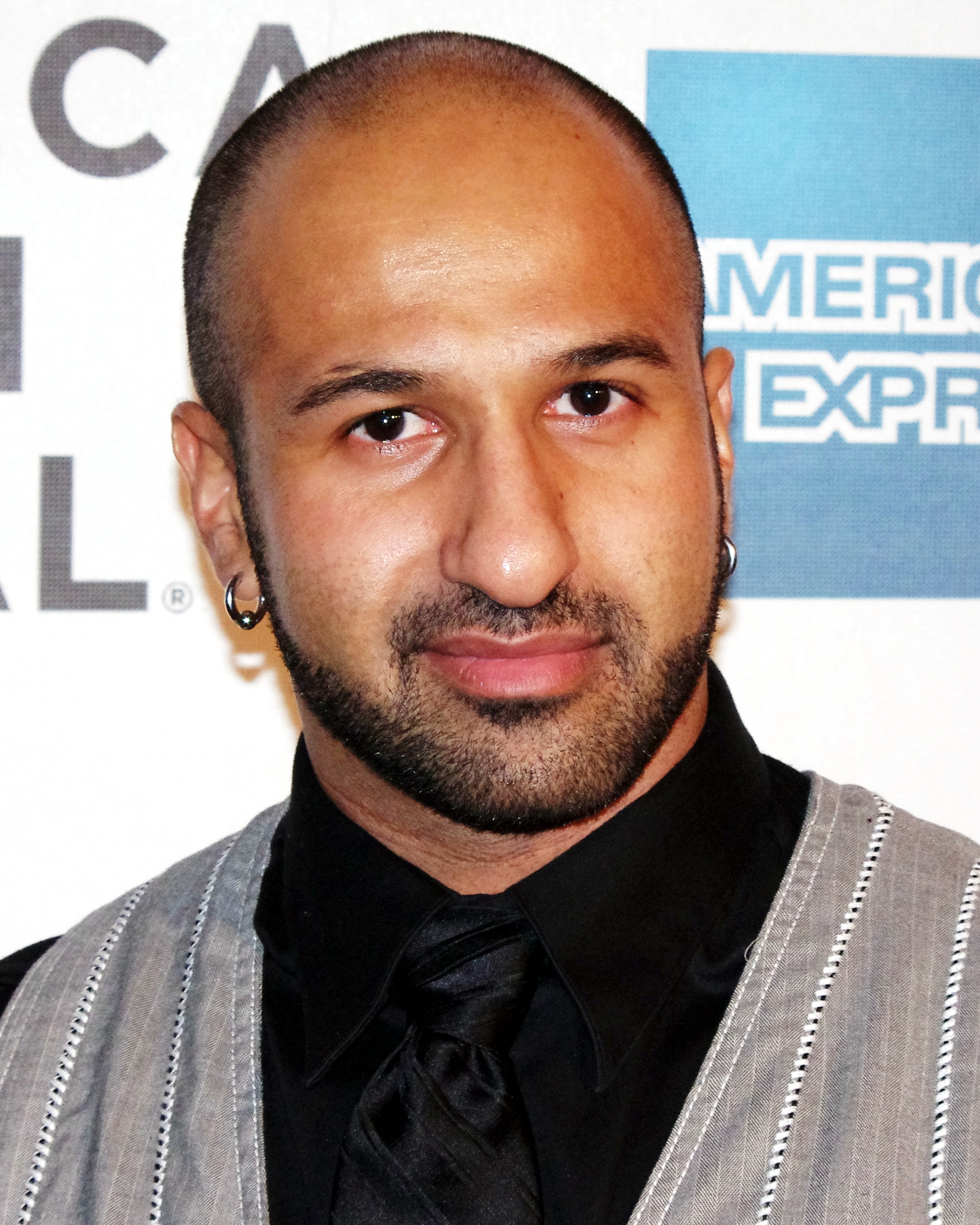
- Daivari at the 2013 Tribeca Film Festival world premiere of Mansome

Personal information
- Born: Dara Shawn Daivari; April 30, 1984 (age 42) Minneapolis, Minnesota, U.S.
- Relative: Ariya Daivari (brother)

Professional wrestling career
- Ring name(s): Shawn Daivari; Daivari; Khosrow Daivari; Dubai; DelAvar Daivari; Shawn Daivari; Raheem Ali Assad; Sheik Abdul Bashir; Faris Gotch
- Billed height: 5 ft 10 in (1.78 m)
- Billed weight: 189 lb (86 kg)
- Billed from: Detroit, Michigan; Minneapolis, Minnesota; Tehran, Iran
- Trained by: Adnan Al-Kaissie; Eddie Sharkey; Tom Prichard
- Debut: 1999
- Retired: 2021

Dara Shawn Daivari (Persian: دارا داوری; born April 30, 1984) is an American retired professional wrestler, better known by the ring name Khosrow Daivari or simply Daivari. As of June 2021, he is signed to WWE, where he works as a producer. He is also known for his time in Total Nonstop Action Wrestling (TNA), where he is a former one-time TNA X Division Champion and has also previous made appearances in Ring of Honor (ROH) and Lucha Underground.

Daivari, along with fellow wrestlers Ken Anderson, brother Ariya Daivari, Molly Holly, and Arik Cannon, operates a wrestling school called The Academy: School of Professional Wrestling in Minneapolis, Minnesota, Daivari's hometown.

== Professional wrestling career ==
=== Early career (1999–2004) ===
Daivari grew up admiring Mick Foley and Bret Hart. His childhood hero was Shawn Michaels. He participated in his first professional wrestling match at age 15. He started his career in the upper midwest independent scene. He is known for representing Iran for international title matches.

On October 19, 1998, Daivari appeared on Nitro as a fan being interviewed by Mike Tenay.

He appeared on the February 26, 2003, episode of TNA Xplosion and wrestled a tag team match against Mike Sanders and Glenn Gilberti with Ken Anderson. He also appeared on the October 5, 2003, episode of Sunday Night Heat as Shawn Daivari, losing his match against Tommy Dreamer. He also made four appearances for independent promotion Ring of Honor (ROH) between April and July 2004.

=== World Wrestling Entertainment (2004–2007, 2011, 2018–present) ===
==== Managing Muhammad Hassan (2004–2005) ====
Daivari signed a contract with World Wrestling Entertainment (WWE) in August 2004 and debuted on the December 13 episode of Raw alongside Muhammad Hassan as Khosrow Daivari, later shortened to Daivari. Their gimmick was that of two Arab Americans who were tired of the prejudice and stereotypes they were receiving after the 9/11 attacks. Ironically, Daivari would scream instructions in Persian to Hassan when working as his manager. In the weeks leading up to their debut, the two men would appear on Raw in vignettes promoting their hatred towards "America". In the following weeks, they would back up their words with actions, initiating a feud with Raw announcers Jim Ross and Jerry "The King" Lawler. At WrestleMania 21 on April 3, 2005, Daivari and Hassan were involved in an angle with Hulk Hogan. While attacking injured wrestler Eugene, Hogan came to the ring and ejected both men from the ring.

The following night on Raw, Daivari and Hassan interrupted Shawn Michaels during a promo. The two attacked Michaels and left him helpless in the ring. This led to Daivari's first singles match in WWE, on the April 11 episode of Raw. Although Michaels was heavily favored, Daivari, with help from Hassan, got the upset win. Enraged, Michaels demanded a match against both Daivari and Hassan. Raw General Manager Eric Bischoff refused to grant a handicap match, but instead ordered Michaels to find a partner. That partner turned out to be Daivari and Hassan's WrestleMania foe Hulk Hogan.

On the April 18 episode of Raw, Michaels was once again double teamed by Daivari and Hassan until Hogan appeared to make the save. Hogan accepted Michaels' offer to tag and the match was set for the Backlash pay-per-view on May 1. At Backlash, Hogan and Michaels picked up the win which led to friction between the two since Hassan blamed Daivari for the loss. The next night on Raw, Hassan verbally and physically attacked Daivari leaving their future as a team in question.

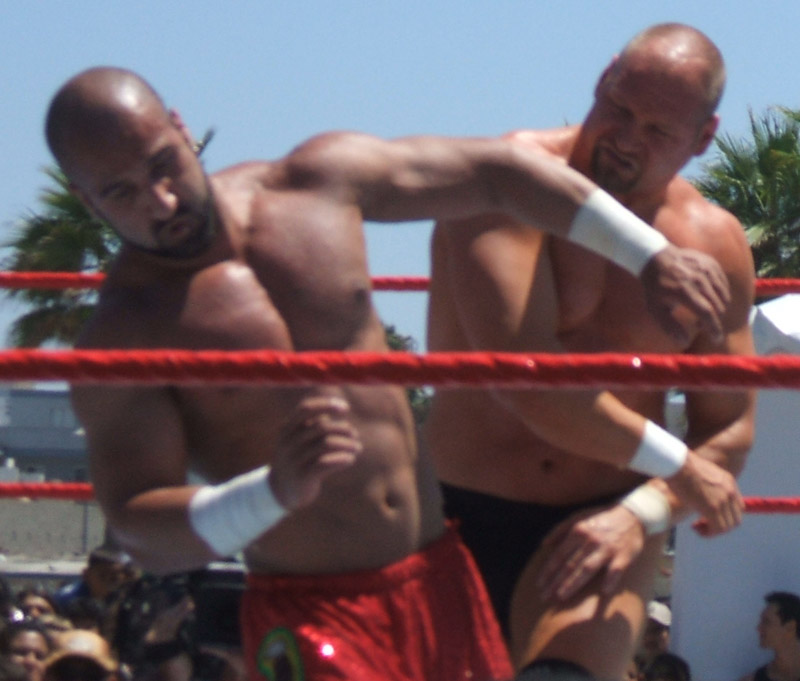
Daivari wrestling with Val Venis

Both Daivari and Hassan were later drafted to the SmackDown! brand on the June 23 episode of SmackDown! as part of a package deal. On the July 7 episode of SmackDown!, then General Manager Theodore Long put Daivari in a match against The Undertaker for that night, and Muhammad Hassan in a match against The Undertaker at The Great American Bash on July 24 in which the winner would be the number one contender to the World Heavyweight Championship. Daivari was squashed easily in that match, after which Hassan began to pray on the ramp, summoning five masked men to the ring. The masked men beat and strangled The Undertaker into submission, and Hassan put him in the camel clutch. Afterward, the masked men carried Daivari off like a martyr. The controversial imagery aired unedited in North America despite the terrorist attacks in London earlier that day, but was removed from the Australian and UK broadcasts. This episode of SmackDown! was unusually taped on Monday and, at the time, aired on Thursday, so the skit was taped three days before the attack occurred.

In late July, UPN requested that WWE keep the Muhammad Hassan character off of their network. WWE complied, effectively removing him from SmackDown!. At The Great American Bash, Hassan lost in a match with The Undertaker, and was given the Last Ride through an open stage ramp onto a concrete floor. It was reported that he sustained serious injuries and had to be rushed to a nearby medical facility; this was an angle aimed to "kill off" the character.

Although Hassan would eventually retire from professional wrestling, Daivari reported to WWE's Deep South Wrestling (DSW) developmental territory for training and repackaging. He returned from DSW and, after working in Minneapolis, made his debut in September 2005 on Ohio Valley Wrestling (OVW) television returning as his "Sheik" Daivari persona.

==== Various alliances (2005–2007) ====
On the November 7 episode of Raw, Daivari returned, acting as Kurt Angle's anointed special guest referee in the tag team match between Shawn Michaels and John Cena against Angle and Chris Masters. During the match, Daivari favored Angle and Masters, who won the match via disqualification when Michaels was caught with a chair Angle brought in.

On the November 21 episode of Raw, Angle announced that Daivari was to be the referee for all his future matches, including his WWE Championship match against John Cena for the title at Survivor Series on November 27. Mr. McMahon rescinded that at the kangaroo court trial of Eric Bischoff on the December 5 episode of Raw. Daivari remained aligned with Kurt Angle as his manager.

On the January 13, 2006, episode of SmackDown!, Angle and Daivari moved to the SmackDown! brand, where Angle won the World Heavyweight Championship in a battle royal that same night. Angle later revealed that his contract on Raw had expired, which allowed them to switch brands. Angle was already signed to face Shawn Michaels on the January 16 episode of Raw, however this non-title match went ahead, but Daivari would accidentally cost Angle the match against Michaels. Afterwards, Daivari and Angle argued, but when Daivari slapped Angle, he was Angle Slammed over the ropes and down to the floor on the outside of the ring. During the break, on WWE.com Unlimited, an enraged Angle made it known that Daivari's services were no longer needed.

A short time later, Daivari faced his former client in a match, during which Mark Henry, the number one contender for Angle's title, attacked Angle. After the match, Daivari officially announced that he was now managing Henry and continued to manage Henry during his feud with The Undertaker. Daivari would not be seen on television in the weeks leading up to WrestleMania 22 on April 2 when, at Saturday Night's Main Event XXXII, he suffered a chokeslam and Tombstone Piledriver at the hands of The Undertaker onto the lid of a casket.

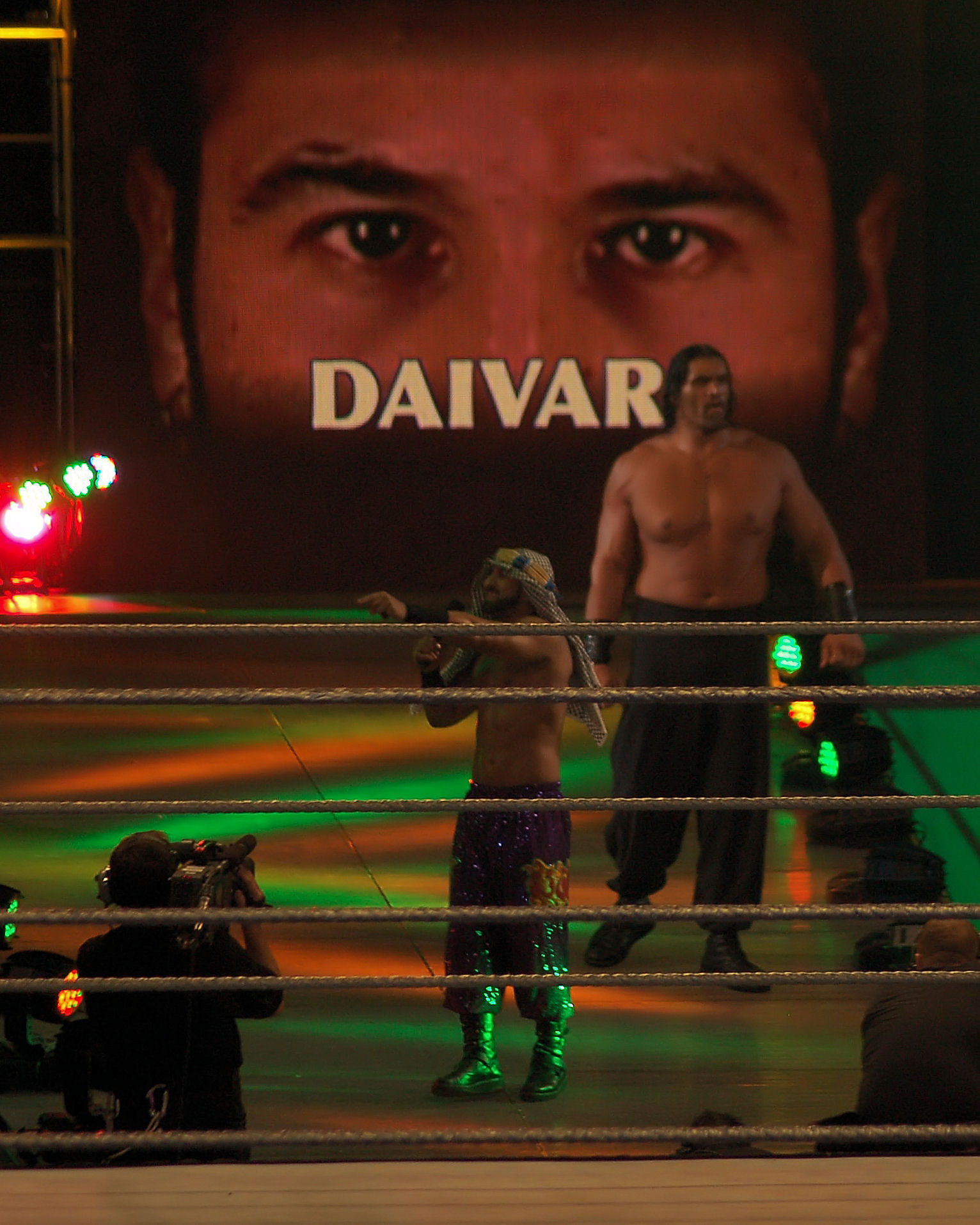
Daivari managed The Great Khali in 2006.

On the April 7 episode of SmackDown!, Daivari made his return bringing in the debuting The Great Khali to attack The Undertaker during his match with Mark Henry. The next week, Daivari officially presented him to the crowd, hyping him as an "unstoppable monster". Over the following weeks, Daivari would accompany Khali to the ring as he attacked various SmackDown! superstars. This would all lead up to a match with The Undertaker at Judgment Day on May 21, which Khali would end up winning. Daivari and Khali appeared as guests on Piper's Pit on the June 2 episode of SmackDown!, in which Roddy Piper made fun of Khali, who supposedly could not speak English. Eventually Piper stood on the bottom rope, attempting to match height with Khali, he managed to say: "If this was twenty years ago", before Khali grabbed him by the throat. Daivari made Khali put Piper down and straightened Piper's jacket disrespectfully, at which Piper slapped Daivari, but was then given a chop by Khali. The Undertaker was the original guest on the Pit, but he declined the invitation a few days before. Daivari continued to accompany The Great Khali to the ring when Khali wrestled or attacked other wrestlers, but when The Great Khali became inactive due to injury, Daivari was taken off the road as well.

Daivari and The Great Khali were moved to the ECW brand officially when they made their ECW debuts on the October 31 episode of ECW, in which Daivari defeated "The Reject" Shannon Moore. Daivari's original theme music was used as well as his Persian rants on the microphone. Afterwards, Moore was manhandled by The Great Khali. Daivari continued his winning streak over the next several weeks with The Great Khali usually following up the contest with a chokebomb on Daivari's opponent. At December to Dismember on December 3, Daivari got a victory over Tommy Dreamer following a schoolboy roll-up. Dreamer then chased Daivari all the way to the back, but The Great Khali appeared and caught Dreamer, planting him on the steel ramp with a chokebomb. On the January 8, 2007 episode of Raw, The Great Khali moved to the Raw brand without Daivari. The following night, however, Daivari accompanied Khali to the ring for his match against Dreamer on ECW.

Daivari returned to the SmackDown! brand on the February 9 episode of SmackDown!, defeating then Cruiserweight Champion Gregory Helms in a non-title match. He wrestled in a Cruiserweight Open for the WWE Cruiserweight Championship at No Way Out on February 18, won by Chavo Guerrero. He began wrestling in the Cruiserweight division. He was involved in a feud between Kane and The Great Khali, once again promoting Khali in March. His first match against Kane involved him being dragged backstage by Kane's chain and hook leaving his back with multiple bruises. A few weeks later, Daivari had a rematch with Kane and was again defeated.

==== Singles competition (2007) ====
Daivari returned to SmackDown! a few months later, teaming up with Chavo Guerrero Jr. and Jamie Noble against Jimmy Wang Yang, Paul London and Brian Kendrick in a losing effort. On the June 15 episode of SmackDown!, Daivari competed in a fatal four-way number one contender match for the Cruiserweight Championship, which he lost to Yang and also involved Shannon Moore and Noble.

Daivari was drafted back to the Raw brand in the supplemental draft on June 17, 2007. He re-debuted on the June 18 episode of Raw, losing to Jeff Hardy. On the July 30 episode of Raw, Daivari was defeated by Cody Rhodes who had to win his match or else being fired from WWE. Daivari's losing streak continued when he failed to win the position of General Manager of Raw by been eliminated early in the battle royal the week after Rhodes defeated him. Daivari then started to get on a roll on Heat (Raw's sister show) being victorious against Super Crazy and "Hacksaw" Jim Duggan. His return on the September 17 episode of Raw saw him lose to Duggan in a flag match.

On October 16, Daivari was released from his WWE contract.

==== Sporadic appearances and producer role (2011, 2018–2020, 2021–present) ====
On May 3, 2011, Daivari made his WWE return by competing in a dark match before the SmackDown tapings, losing to Ted DiBiase. In 2018, Daivari made his second return to WWE during a segment at Greatest Royal Rumble in Saudi Arabia where he and his brother, Ariya Daivari, were driven out of the ring by four new Saudi recruits. He was later hired by WWE as a producer in January 2019, and was eventually released on April 15, 2020, as part of budget cuts stemming from the COVID-19 pandemic. He returned on June 11, 2021.

=== Independent circuit (2007–2008) ===
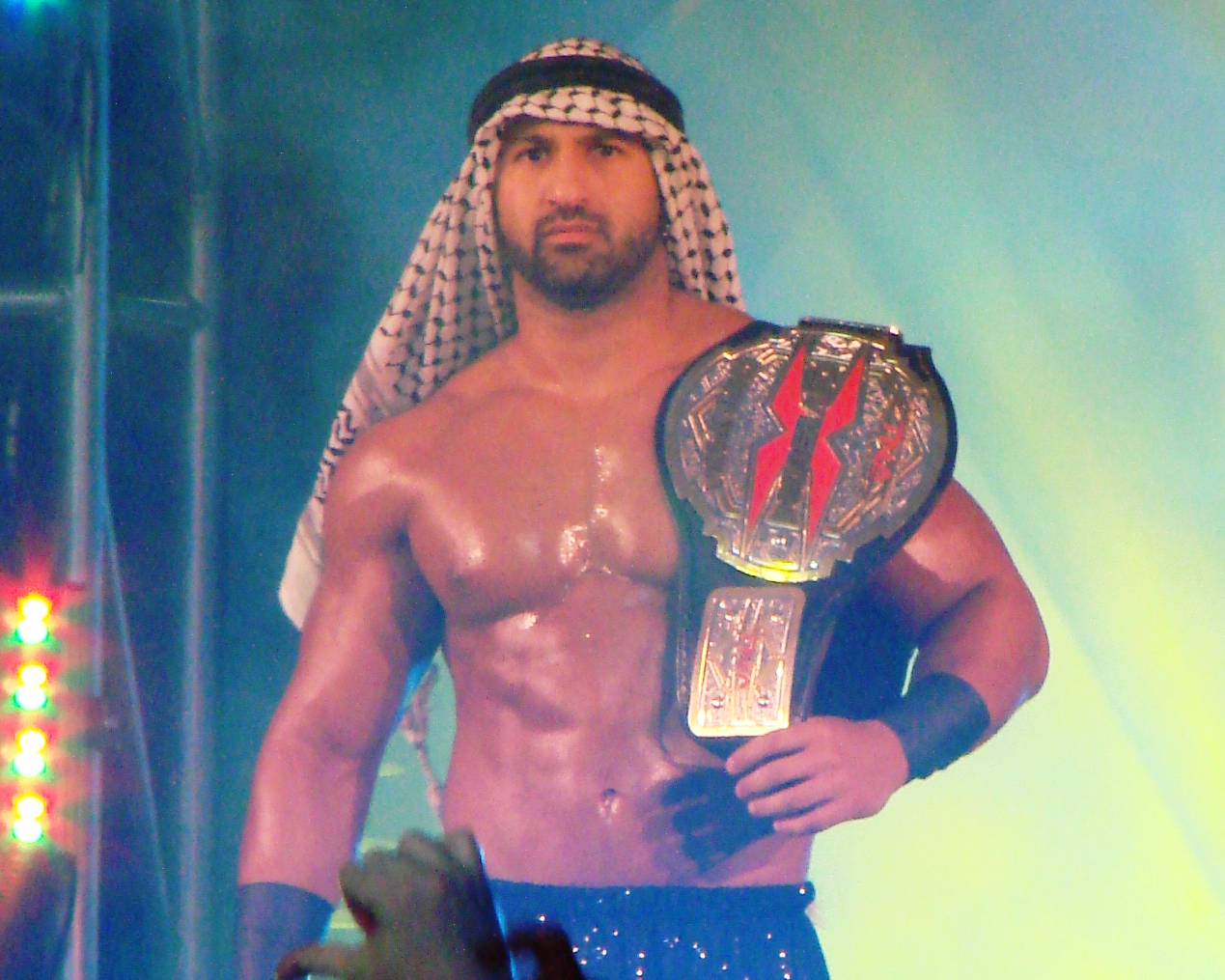
Daivari, as Sheik Abdul Bashir, with the TNA X Division Championship belt

Daivari made his debut for Professional Championship Wrestling in Arlington, Texas, at PCW's Heroes 2 Legends event in November 2007. He wrestled J.T. Lamotta and "Jiggle-O" James Johnson in a triple threat match for the PCW Cruiserweight Championship, which Lamotta won. He returned to PCW on February 23, 2008, at PCW's Big Bang '08 event to again wrestle a triple threat match for the PCW Cruiserweight Championship, this time against Robert Evans and Aaron Eagle, who won and became the new champion. On September 6, 2008, it was announced by The Bussey Brothers that Daivari would return on September 20, 2008, to team with them to take on Aaron Eagle and a partner of his choosing. Eagle had chosen Action Jackson to be his tag team partner. However, Jackson was injured at the hands of Mace Malone. PCW World Heavyweight Champion, Mike Foxx, who was supposedly suspended and also Eagle's main rival, surprisingly saved Eagle from an attack and announced he would be Eagle's partner. The stipulation was that if Eagle did not win, he could never get another PCW World Heavyweight Championship shot again. On September 20, Daivari and The Busseys defeated Eagle and Foxx when Foxx turned on Eagle and Daivari debuted his new finisher move, the WMD – Weapon of Mass Destruction (a DDT to a kneeling opponent), for the victory. Afterwards, Foxx announced he would give Eagle one final title shot at Sick 'n' Twisted on October 11.

On April 4, 2008, Daivari made his AMW debut in a triple threat match against Wally Darkmon and Robert Evans for the AMW Light Heavyweight Championship. Daivari won the match to become the new AMW Light Heavyweight Champion. During most of 2008, he feuded with Wally Darkmon and on September 12, 2008, he lost the AMW Light Heavyweight Championship to Darkmon in a casket match.

In June 2008, Davari took part in an Irish Whip Wrestling (IWW) event in the ESB Arena of Dublin, Ireland, where he lost in the main event to Mandrake for the IWW International Heavyweight Championship.

=== Total Nonstop Action Wrestling (2008–2009) ===
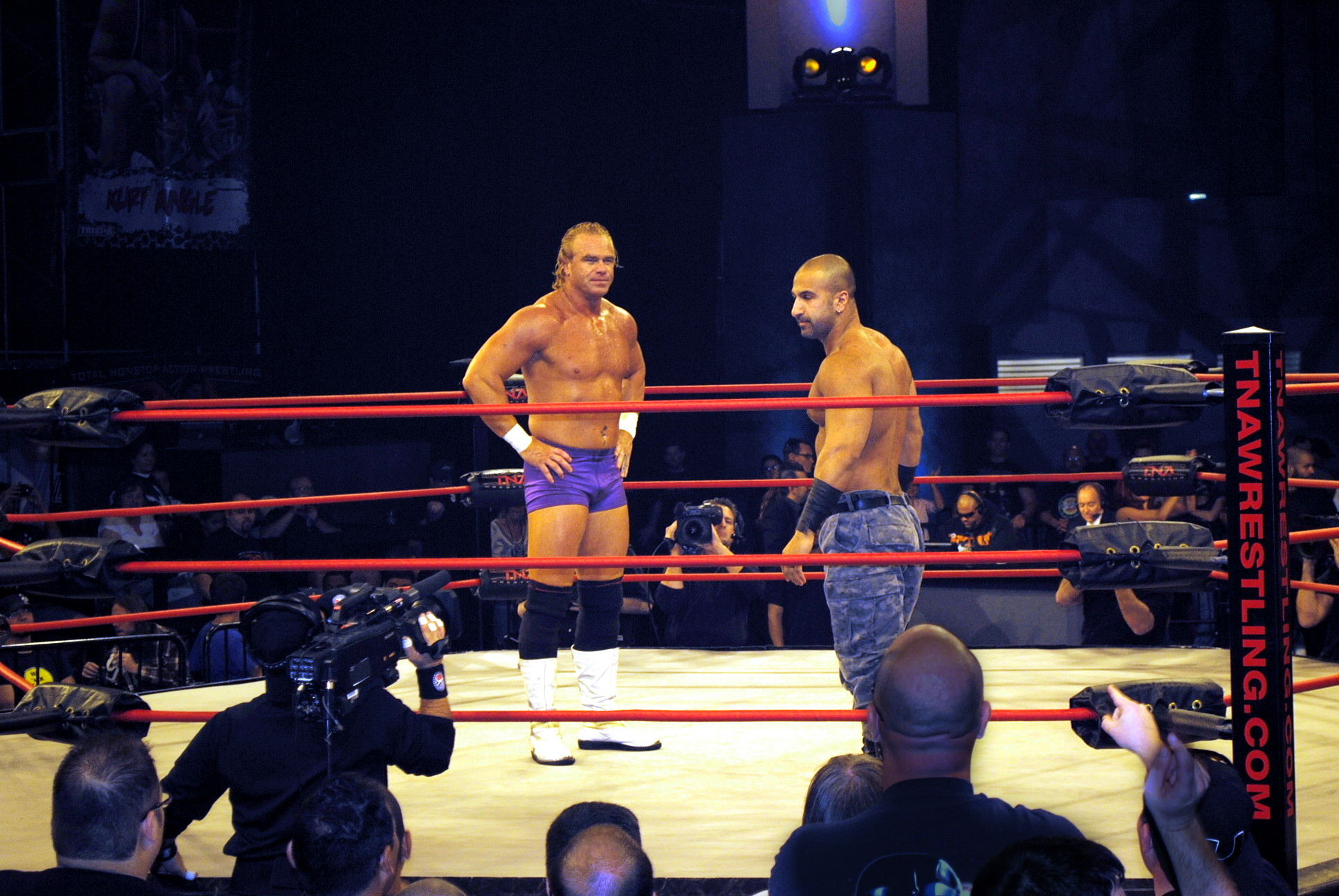
Daivari as Sheik Abdul Bashir against Kip James

Daivari debuted in Total Nonstop Action Wrestling (TNA) on the June 12, 2008, episode of Impact! as the captain to Team International in 2008's World X Cup Tournament. Daivari then signed a contract with TNA. On the July 24 episode of Impact!, after the conclusion of the X Cup, it was announced that he had joined the TNA roster under the name of Sheik Abdul Bashir. Retaining his anti-American gimmick and also adding a bullying mean streak, he quickly established himself as a heel after helping Petey Williams retain the TNA X Division Championship over Consequences Creed at Hard Justice on August 10, as well as delivering promos to draw heat. His official debut match on Impact! was a victory over Jay Lethal.

Bashir won the X Division Championship at No Surrender on September 14, by defeating Williams and Creed in a three-way match. At Bound for Glory IV on October 12, Bashir defeated Creed in another match for the X Division Championship. On the October 23 live episode of Impact!, Bashir successfully defended the X Division Championship against Jay Lethal. After the match, he attacked Rhino after being confronted by him over his political views.

Bashir at a TNA house show in Dublin, Ireland in January 2009

On the November 13 episode of Impact!, Bashir lost the X Division Championship to Eric Young. During the match, Bashir shoved TNA Official Shane Sewell to the mat after Sewell questioned Bashir and the TNA audience of Bashir's actions during the match. Sewell became enraged, removed his shirt and attacked Bashir, which led Eric Young to hit his Death Valley driver on Bashir and pinning him for the win and the championship. However, Bashir was awarded the championship back the following week due to Sewell's interference, thus continuing his original title reign and making Young's title reign null and void. Sewell helped Young to defeat Bashir for the title for the second time at Final Resolution on December 7, ending Bashir's reign at 84 days. After the match, Bashir bloodied Sewell and tried to leave with the championship belt, but was stopped by Jim Cornette who announced that he had decided to vacate the championship. At Genesis on January 11, 2009, Sewell defeated Bashir in a grudge match that ended their feud.

In July, Bashir formed an alliance with Eric Young, Kiyoshi and The British Invasion (Doug Williams, Brutus Magnus and Rob Terry) known as World Elite. They were also later joined by Homicide. At Final Resolution on December 20, Bashir took part in the "Feast or Fired" match and was able to pick up one of the four briefcases. However, the briefcase he had picked up included a pink slip, which led to him being immediately fired from the company. Daivari would later say he originally signed a two-year extension with the understanding that Jeff Jarrett would be his boss, but after Jarrett stepped down a month later, he could not see eye to eye with the new management and asked for his release.

=== Return to ROH (2010–2011) ===
Daivari made his return to ROH on February 5, 2010, at the tapings of Ring of Honor Wrestling on HDNet, once again portraying an anti-American heel. At the March 6 tapings, he joined Prince Nana's stable The Embassy. On June 19, 2010, at Death Before Dishonor VIII, he participated in a gauntlet match for Roderick Strong's ROH World Championship. On September 11, 2010, at Glory By Honor IX, Daivari unsuccessfully challenged Eddie Edwards for the ROH World Television Championship.

=== Lucha Underground (2015) ===
On April 15, 2015, Daivari made his debut at Lucha Underground as DelAvar Daivari, a wrestler from a wealthy family, being seen sitting in attendance during the night within the audience. On the April 22, 2015, episode, Daivari attacked El Texano Jr. after Texano pushed him, which cost Texano's team the Lucha Underground Trios Championship match. On May 13, 2015, Daivari made his in-ring debut against Texano, which Daivari won by disqualification after Texano attacked the referee. On May 20, 2015, Daivari hired Big Ryck as his bodyguard, both of them attacking Texano as well as Bengala. Due to the alliance not paying off for Daivari, he attacked Ryck with a steel folding chair during a seven-way match at Ultima Lucha.

Daivari didn't appear in Season 2. However, he wrestled Paul London in a dark match at Ultima Lucha Dos in which he was defeated.

=== Return to the independent circuit (2010–2018) ===
Daivari made his debut in Juggalo Championship Wrestling (JCW) in At Oddball Wrestling on August 14, 2010, where The Daivari Brothers (Shawn and his sibling Arya), lost to The Ring Rydas. On November 10, 2010, in the first event of the tour, he defeated Dunkan Disorderly in Bordeaux, France, to win the AWR No Limits Championship. Daivari made his American Wrestling Rampage debut on AWR's seven-night Twisted Steel Tour. On May 8, 2011, at Pro Wrestling Syndicate Vendetta event, Daivari won the vacant PWS New York State Championship. Several days later at Canadian Wrestling's Elite, he and Ariya Daivari went to the finals CWE Tag Team Championship Tournament, but lost to Danny Duggan and Kenny Omega.

In June 2011, Daivari, working under the ring name Dubai, was announced as one of the four team captains for the pilot tapings of All Wheels Wrestling. At the pilot tapings on June 29, Dubai was first defeated by RPM (Jay Lethal) in a five-minute Iron Man match and then by Schwagg Dutt (Sonjay Dutt) in an Ultimate X match, which also included Aaron Aguilera and RPM. In December 2011, Daivari took part in TNA's India project, Ring Ka King, where he resumed the Abdul Bashir gimmick and formed The Sheiks with his brother Arya, who worked as Mustafa Bashir.

On May 12, 2012, Daivari won the Big Time Wrestling Cruiserweight Championship. In October, he and Sonjay Dutt wrestled for Family Wrestling Entertainment (FWE) challenging the Adrenaline Express for the FWE Tag Team Championship. On October 6, Daivari defeated Crowbar in the House of Hardcore's (HOH) first show. On a telecast of Portland Wrestling Uncut which aired on November 3, 2012, on Portland, Oregon, station KPTV, Daivari lost via pinfall to local star Exile, though the outcome was disputed because Daivari pointed out that he had his foot on the bottom rope when he was pinned.

As of 2018, he has only made a few appearances on the independent circuit, most notably for Insane Championship Wrestling and The Brian Kendrick's promotion Wrestling Pro Wrestling (WPW).

=== Return to Impact Wrestling (2020–2021) ===
On October 24, 2020, at Bound for Glory, he made an unannounced appearance as a participant in the Call Your Shot gauntlet match under the ring name Daivari, which he failed to win as he was eliminated by Brian Myers. At Turning Point, Daivari lost to Eddie Edwards. Daivari made his return at Genesis as a competitor in the fourth Super X Cup tournament, where he lost in the first round to Jake Something.

=== Major League Wrestling (2021) ===
In January 2021, Major League Wrestling announced Daivari as the new member of Contra Unit.

== Personal life ==
Daivari is of Iranian descent as he was born to Iranian parents who immigrated to the United States from Iran in the 1970s. He speaks Persian fluently and sometimes incorporates it in his promos. Daivari is the second of three sons. His younger brother Ariya is also a professional wrestler who currently performs in All Elite Wrestling (AEW), and was part of the WWE Cruiserweight Division.

Daivari was featured in the Morgan Spurlock directed documentary Mansome.

In October 2012, Daivari gained attention for choking a drunk, disruptive passenger unconscious with a rear naked choke on a lightrail en route to the Minneapolis–Saint Paul International Airport, after police were slow to respond to another passenger hitting an emergency button.

In 2016, Daivari and fellow WWE alumni Ken Anderson, Molly Holly, and independent wrestler Arik Cannon founded The Academy: School of Professional Wrestling.

== Championships and accomplishments ==
- American Made Wrestling Entertainment
  - AMWE Light Heavyweight Championship (1 time)
- American Wrestling Rampage
  - AWR No Limits Championship (1 time)
- Big Time Wrestling
  - BTW Cruiserweight Championship (1 time)
  - BTW United States Championship (1 time)
- Insane Championship Wrestling (Milwaukee)
  - ICW Tag Team Championship (1 time) – with Ariya Daivari
- Mad Asylum Pro Wrestling
  - MAPW Heavyweight Championship (1 time)
- Midwest Independent Association of Wrestling
  - MIAW Lightweight Championship (1 time)
- Midwest Pro Wrestling
  - MPW Cruiserweight Championship (1 time)
- NEO-PRO Wrestling
  - NEO-PRO Cruiserweight Championship (1 time)
- Over the Top Wrestling
  - OTT No Limits Championship (1 time)
- Portland Wrestling Uncut
  - Pacific Northwest Heavyweight Championship (1 time)
- Pro Wrestling Illustrated
  - PWI ranked him #85 of the top 500 singles wrestlers in the PWI 500 in 2009
- Total Nonstop Action Wrestling
  - TNA X Division Championship (1 time)
  - Feast or Fired (2009 – Pink Slip)
- Varsity Pro Wrestling
  - VPW Championship (1 time)
- Wrestling For Warriors
  - WFW Children's Championship (1 time)
- Wrestling Observer Newsletter
  - Most Disgusting Promotional Tactic (2005) Terrorist angle on day of London bombings
