= Fu Manchu moustache =

Style of facial hair

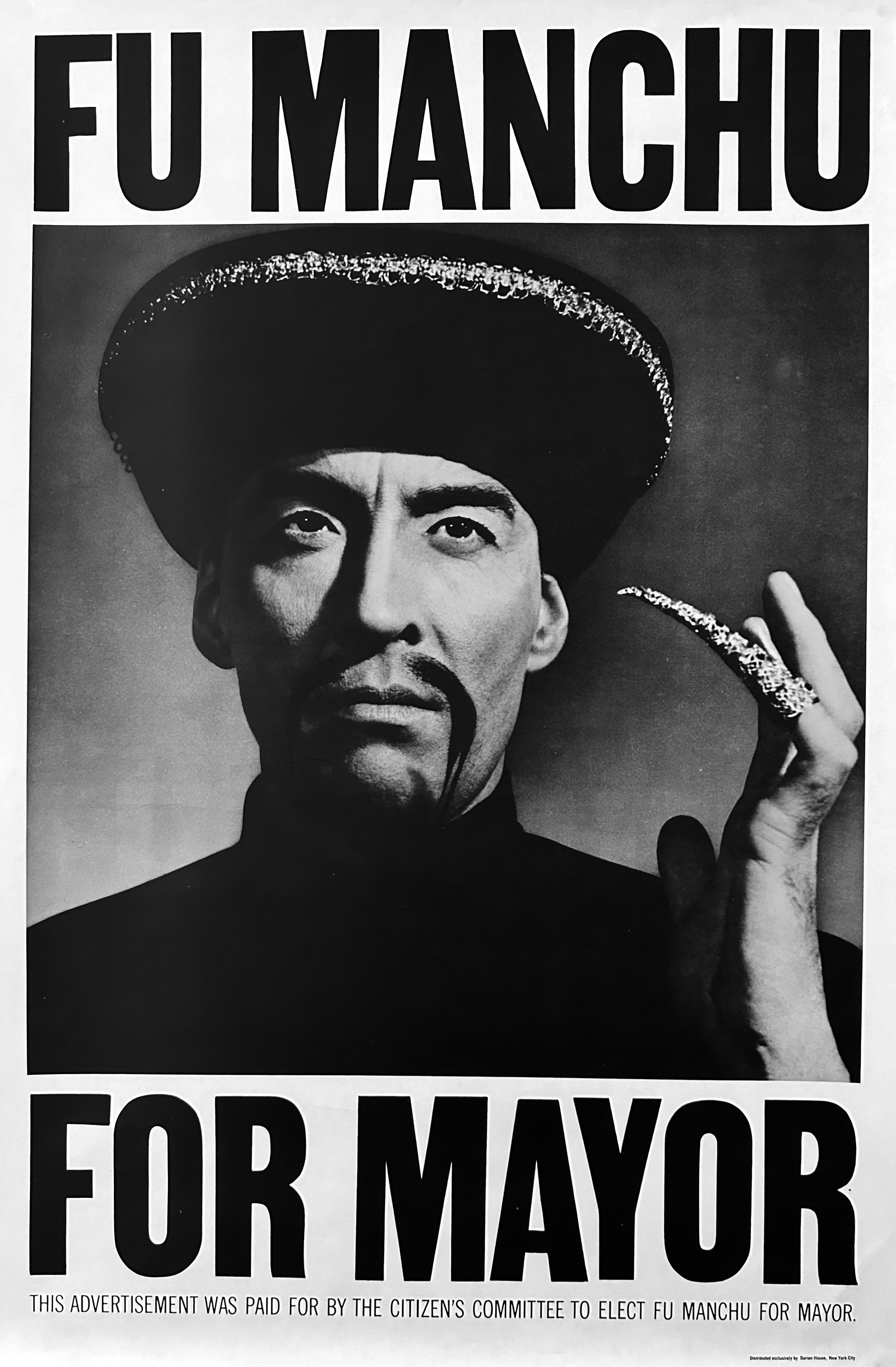
The Fu Manchu moustache, as worn by the eponymous fictional character (played by Christopher Lee in the 1965 film The Face of Fu Manchu)

A Fu Manchu moustache, or simply Fu Manchu (/ˈfuː ˌmænˈtʃuː/ FOO man-CHOO), is a full, straight moustache extending from under the nose past the corners of the mouth and growing downward past the clean-shaven lips and chin in two tapered "tendrils", often extending past the jawline. An expansion of the Fu Manchu sometimes includes a third long "tendril" descending from a small patch on the chin.

The Fu Manchu moustache derives its name from Fu Manchu, a fictional character created by English author Sax Rohmer, who is shown wearing such a moustache in film adaptations of Rohmer's stories. The literary Fu Manchu did not wear a moustache. The famous facial hair first appeared in the British serial The Mystery of Dr. Fu Manchu (1929); the Fu Manchu moustache then became integral to cinematic and television stereotypical depictions of Chinese villains.

The facial hair style is often used to stereotype East Asians, more specifically Chinese people. Many caricatures of Chinese in the 19th and early 20th century depict Chinese with such facial hair. The Fu Manchu is a category of competition in the World Beard and Moustache Championships.

== Confusion with horseshoe moustache ==
The Fu Manchu is similar to (and commonly confused with) the horseshoe (or "biker") moustache; the difference between the two types is that the Fu Manchu is grown exclusively from the corners of the upper lip, creating two long "tendrils" that hang down past the clean-shaven mouth and chin area. The horseshoe simply involves growing the hair on either side of the lips and chin along with the moustache, thus creating the inverted-U or horseshoe shape, with none of the hair hanging over the jawline.

A true Fu Manchu is considerably more difficult and time-consuming to produce as compared to the horseshoe; one moustache-centred publication declares "You probably don't know anybody who has a [real] Fu Manchu."

Horseshoe moustache

Fu Manchu moustache

== See also ==
- List of moustache styles
- List of facial hairstyles
