= Handlebar moustache =

Facial hair style

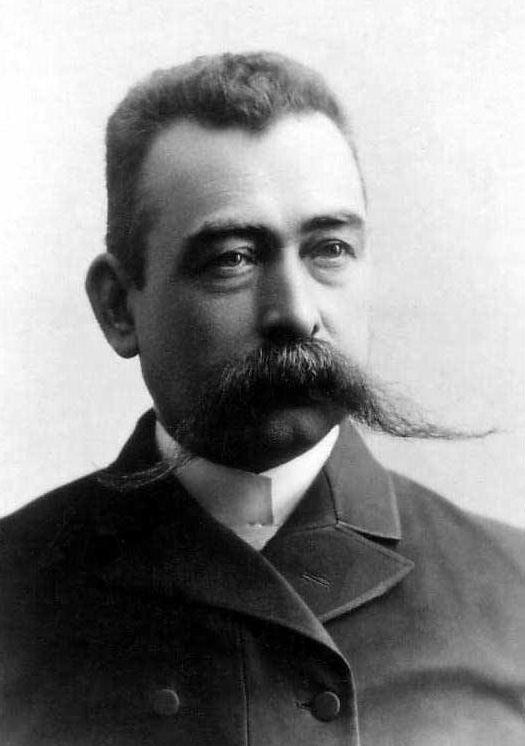
Copenhagen wigmaker about 1893

A handlebar moustache is a moustache with particularly lengthy and upwardly curved extremities. These moustache styles are named for their resemblance to the handlebars of a bicycle. It is also known as a spaghetti moustache, because of its stereotypical association with Italian men. The Handlebar Club humorously describes the style as "a hirsute appendage of the upper lip and with graspable extremities".

== History ==
Similar styles of moustache are quite ancient, appearing on statues and other depictions of Iron Age Celts. In the United States, handlebar moustaches were worn in the later part of the 19th century by Wild West figures like Wyatt Earp. In Europe, handlebar moustaches were often worn by soldiers during the 19th century until roughly the era of World War I.

English comedy actor Jimmy Edwards grew his trademark handlebar moustache in the late 1940s in order to disguise facial injuries sustained as a pilot in World War II.

In 1972, to win a $300 "best facial hair" prize offered by team owner Charlie O. Finley, Oakland A's pitcher Rollie Fingers grew a handlebar moustache which he sported throughout his career and kept after retirement.

The contemporary hipster subculture has embraced the handlebar moustache by mocking conventional ideals of fashion, and by combining a highly manicured handlebar moustache with the portrayal of an unkempt appearance or a haphazardly selected clothing ensemble.

=== Gallery ===
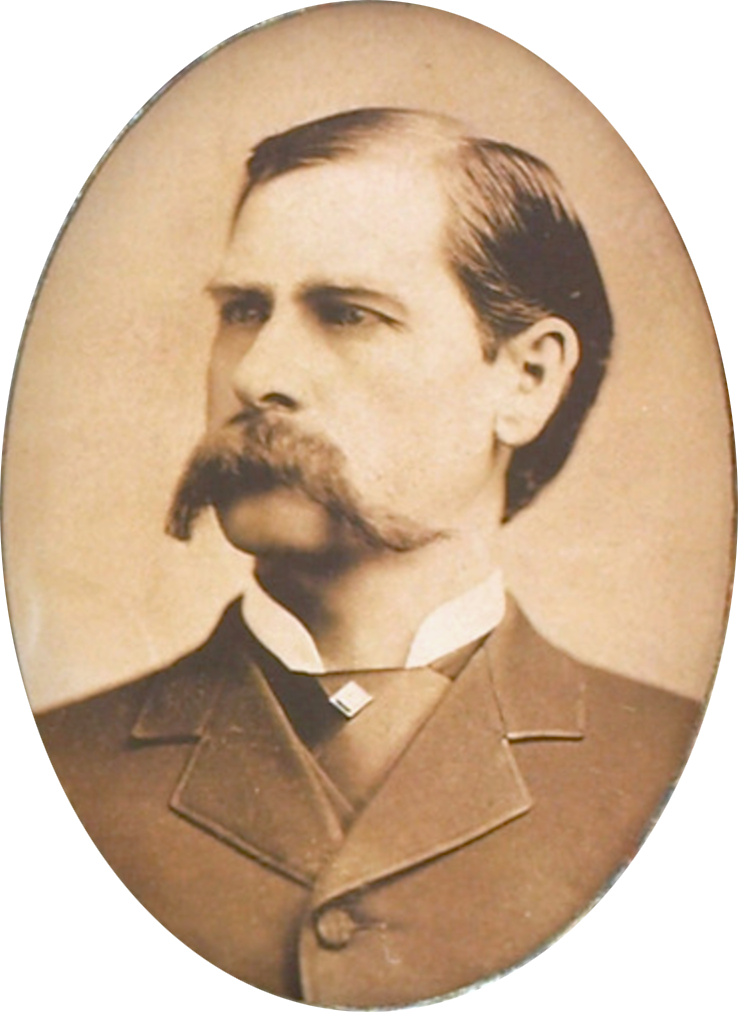
Wyatt Earp

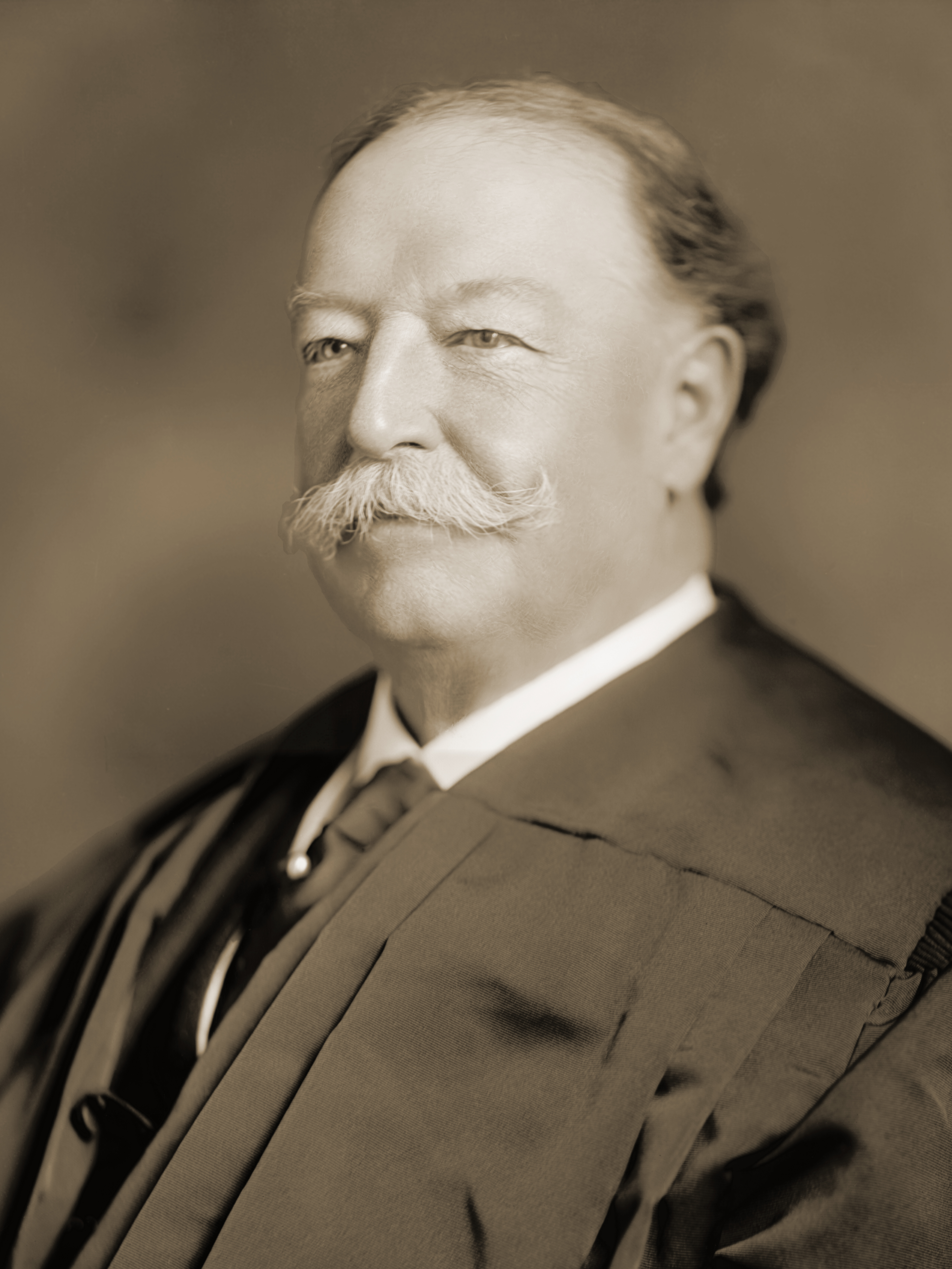
William Howard Taft

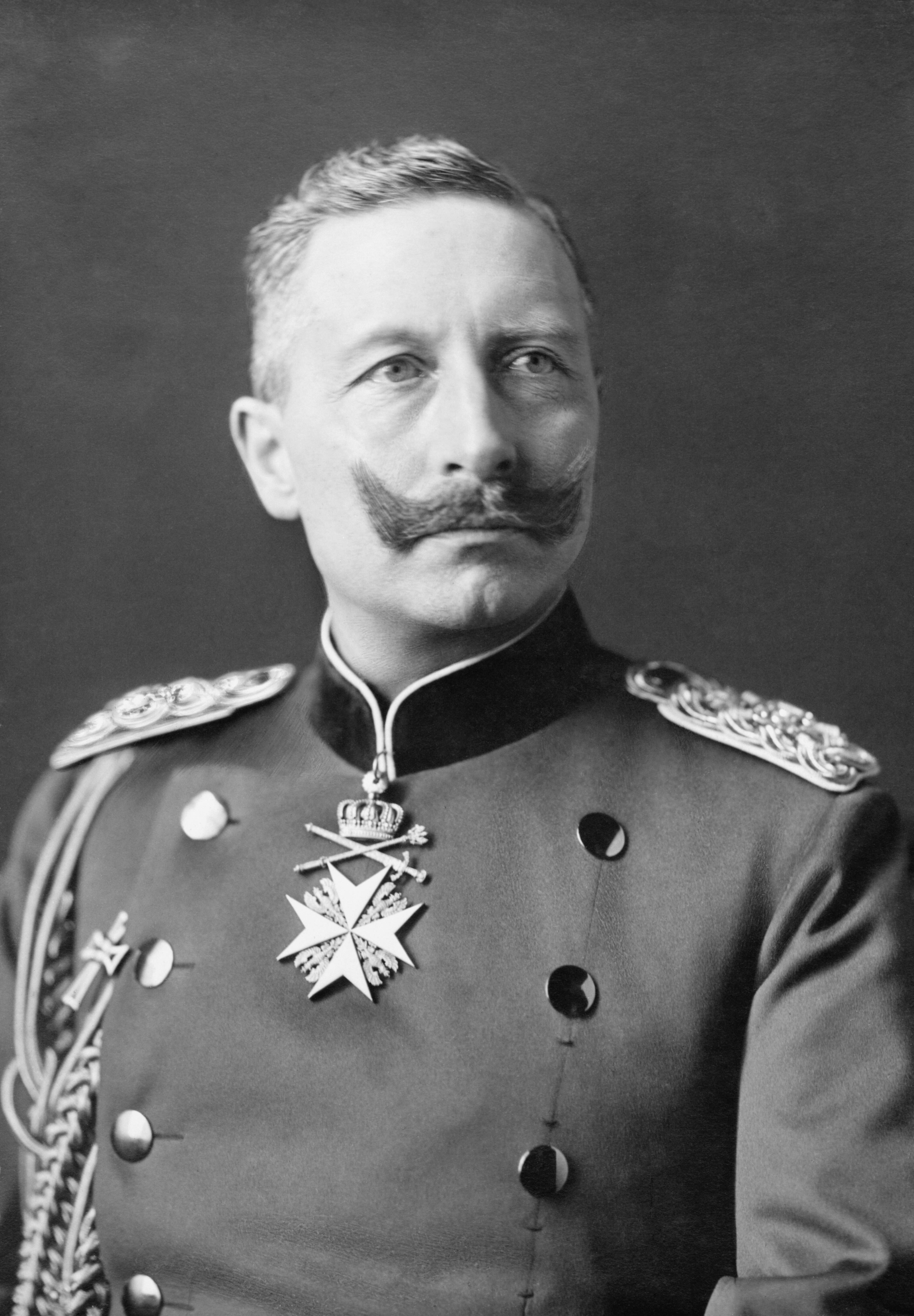
Wilhelm II

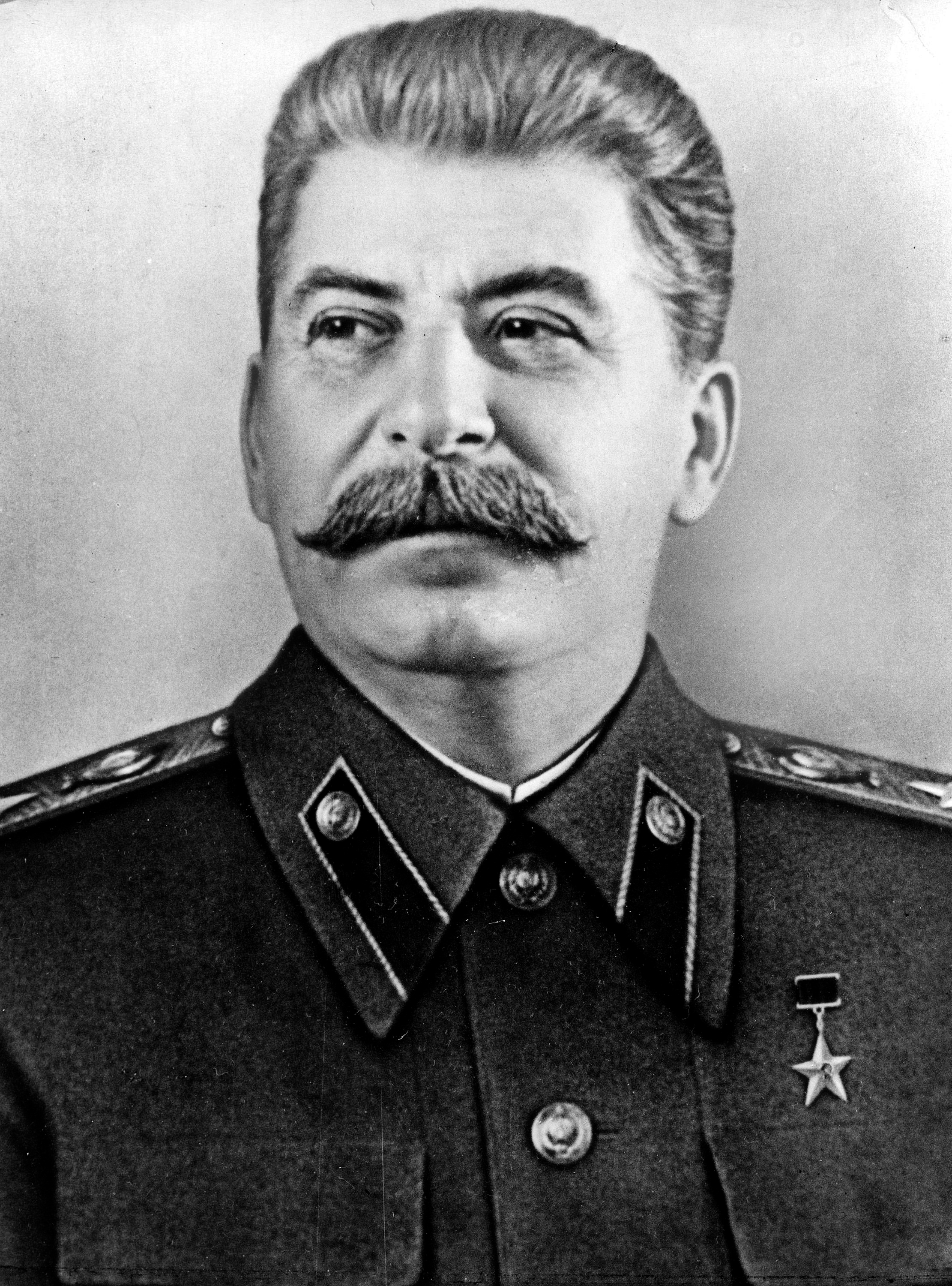
Joseph Stalin

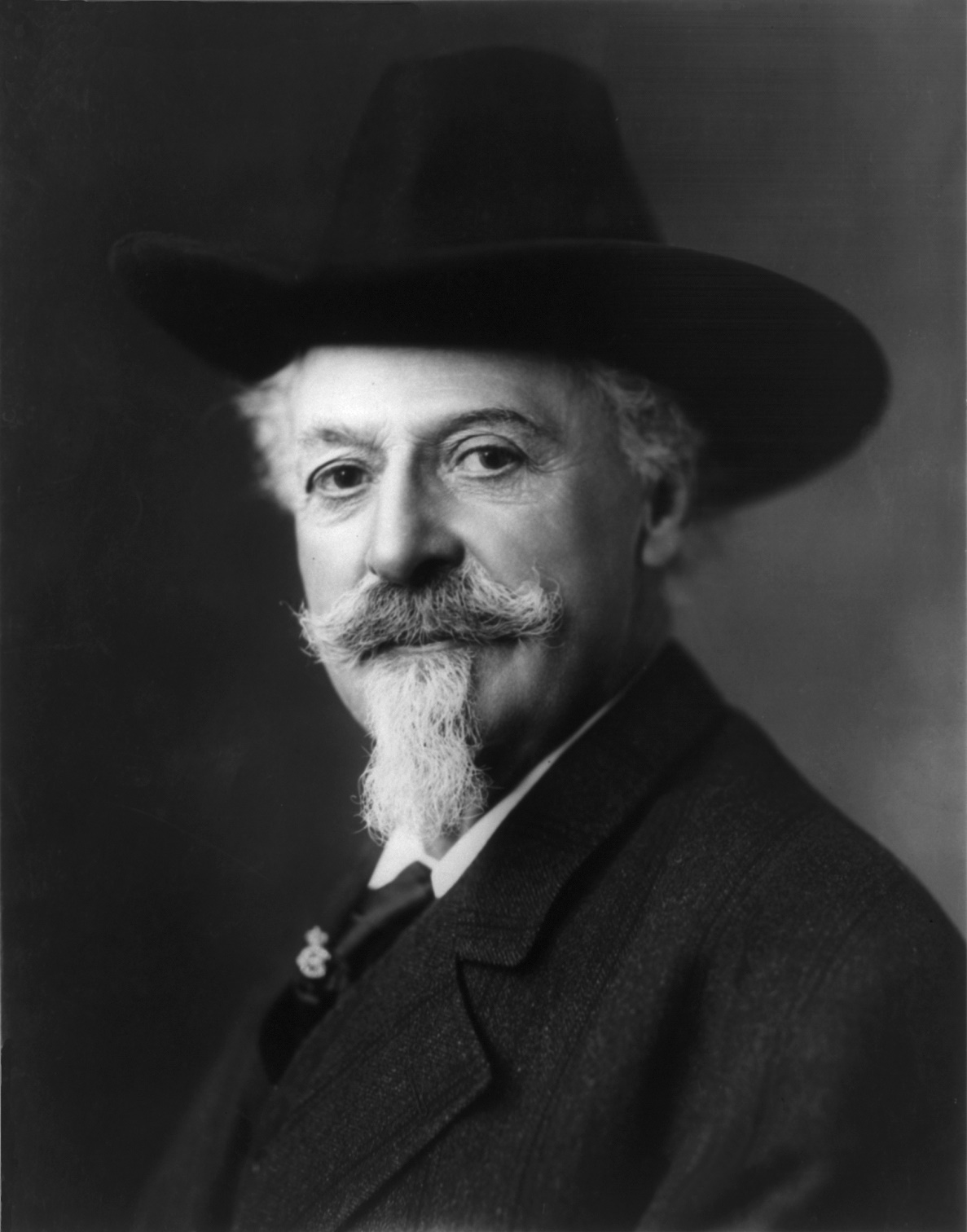
Buffalo Bill

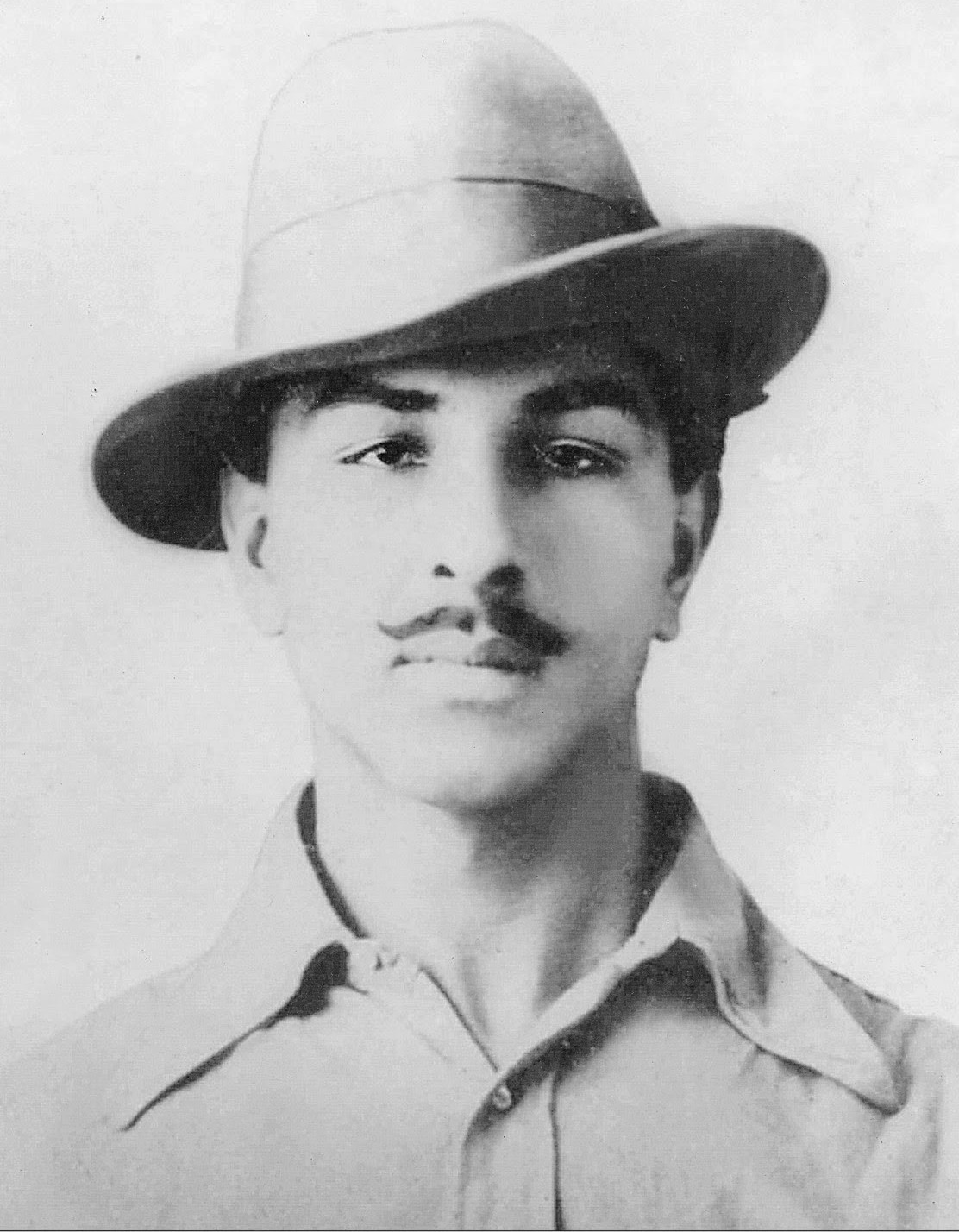
Bhagat Singh

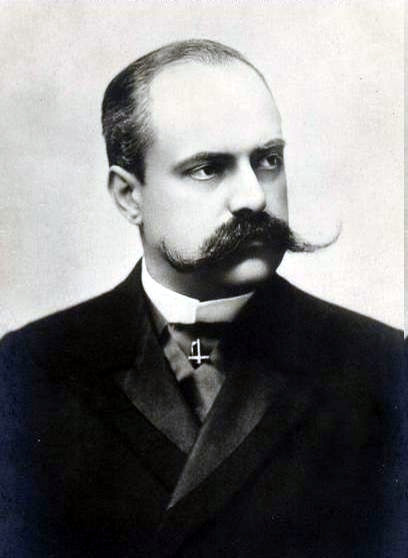
Prince Victor Napoleon

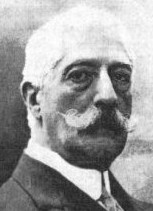
Giovanni Verga

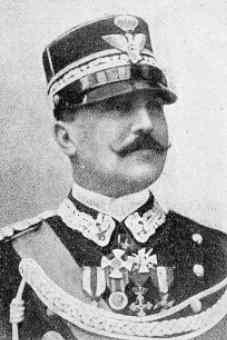
Vincenzo Garioni

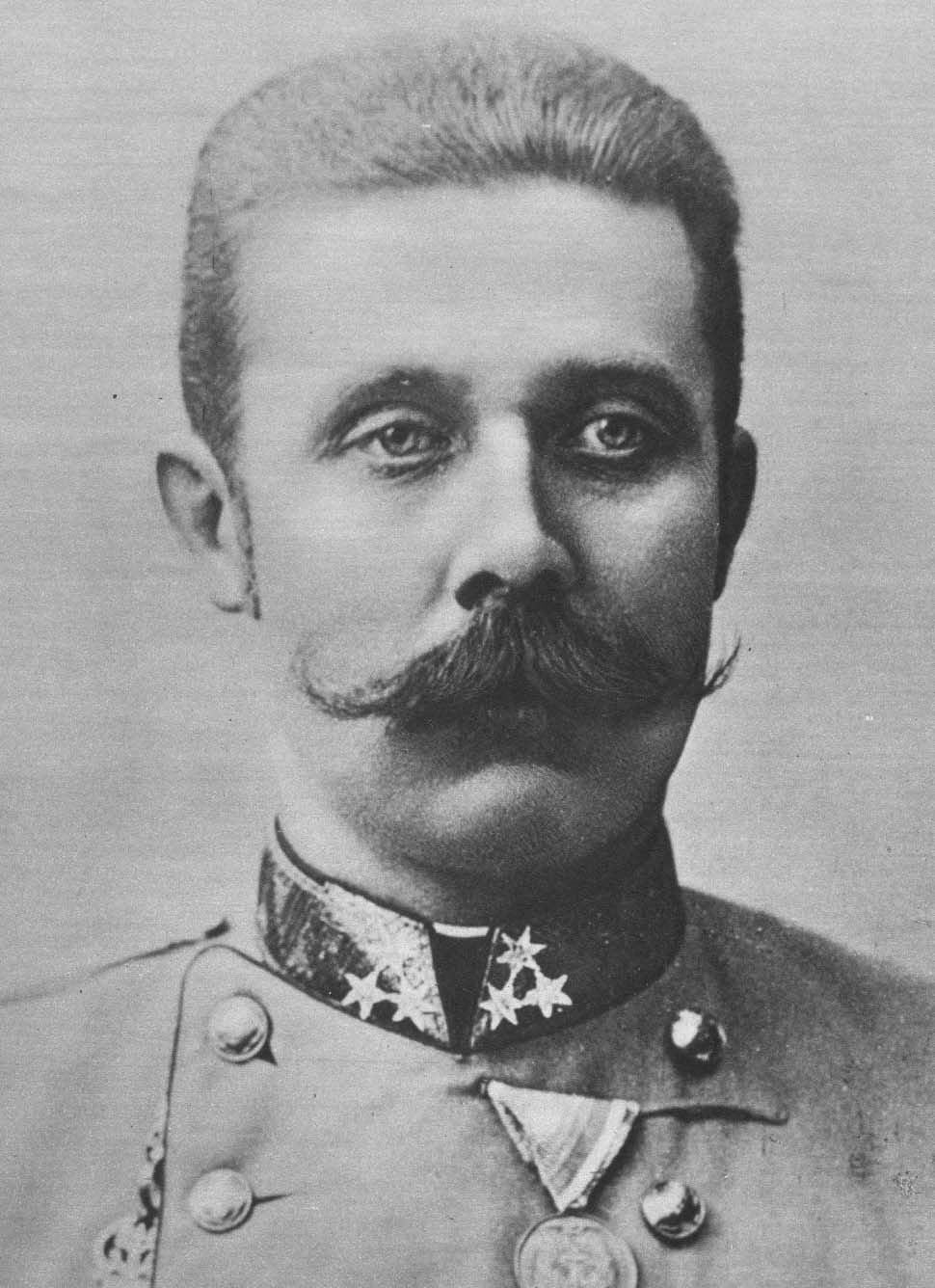
Archduke Franz Ferdinand of Austria

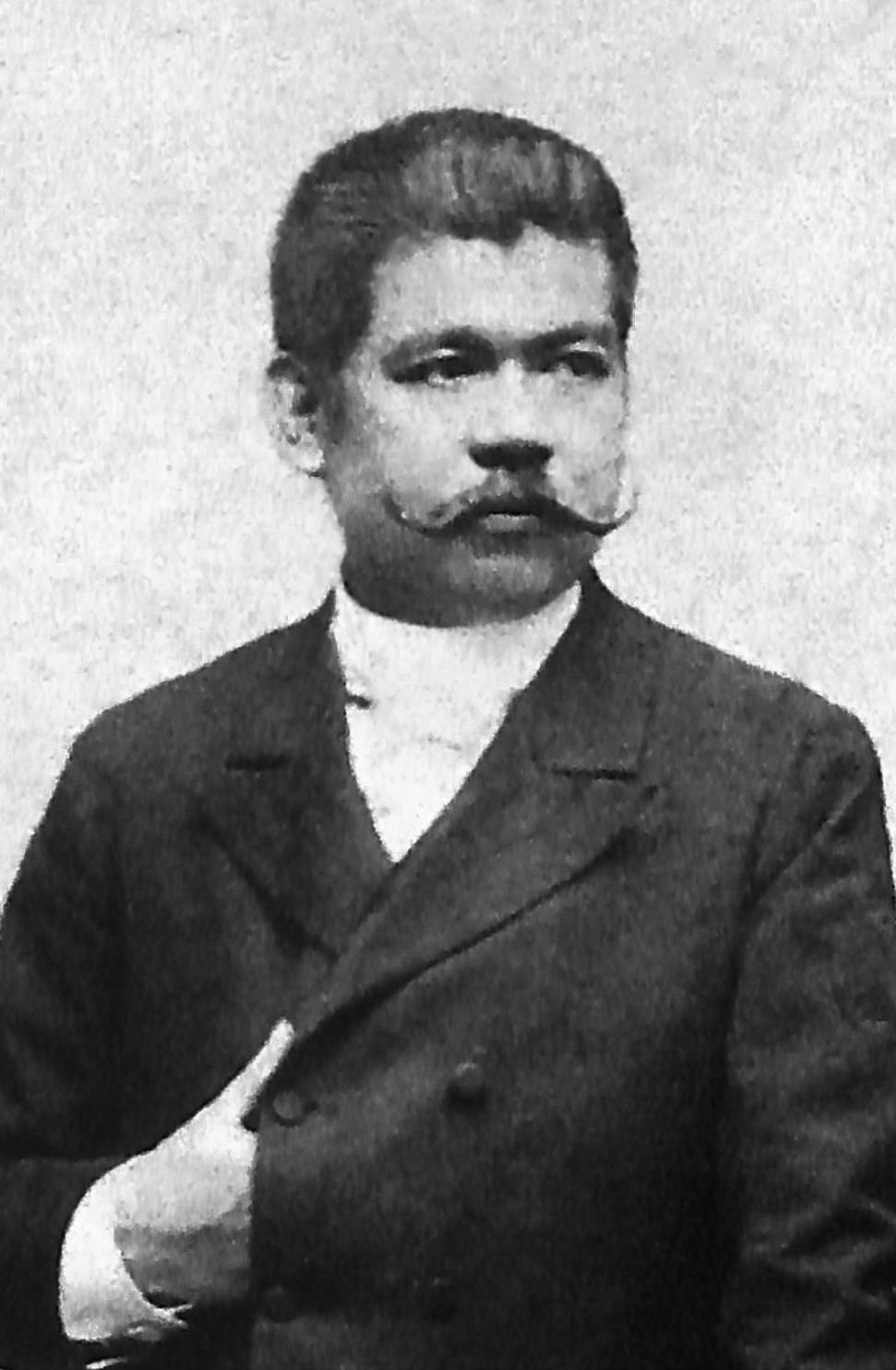
Marcelo H. del Pilar

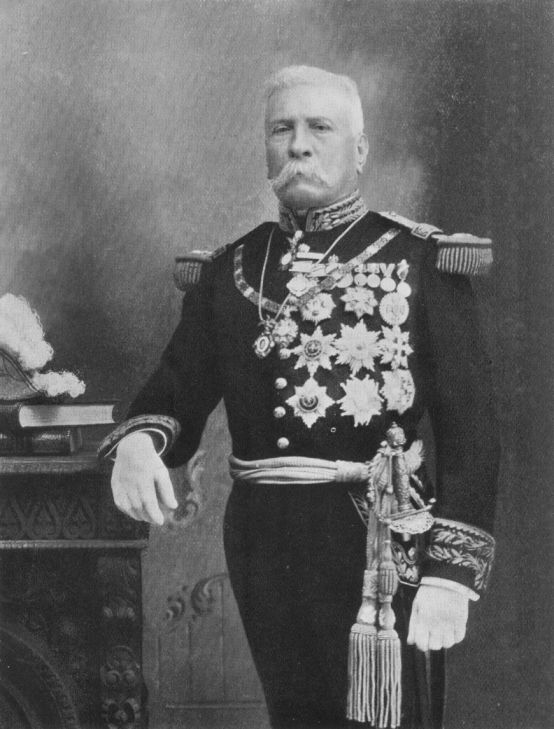
Porfirio Diaz

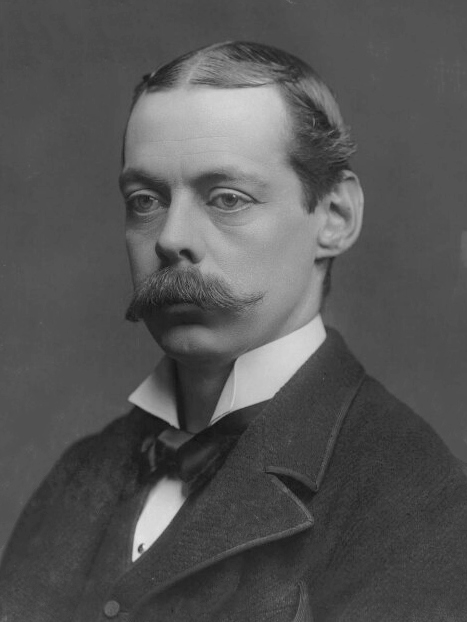
Lord Randolph Churchill

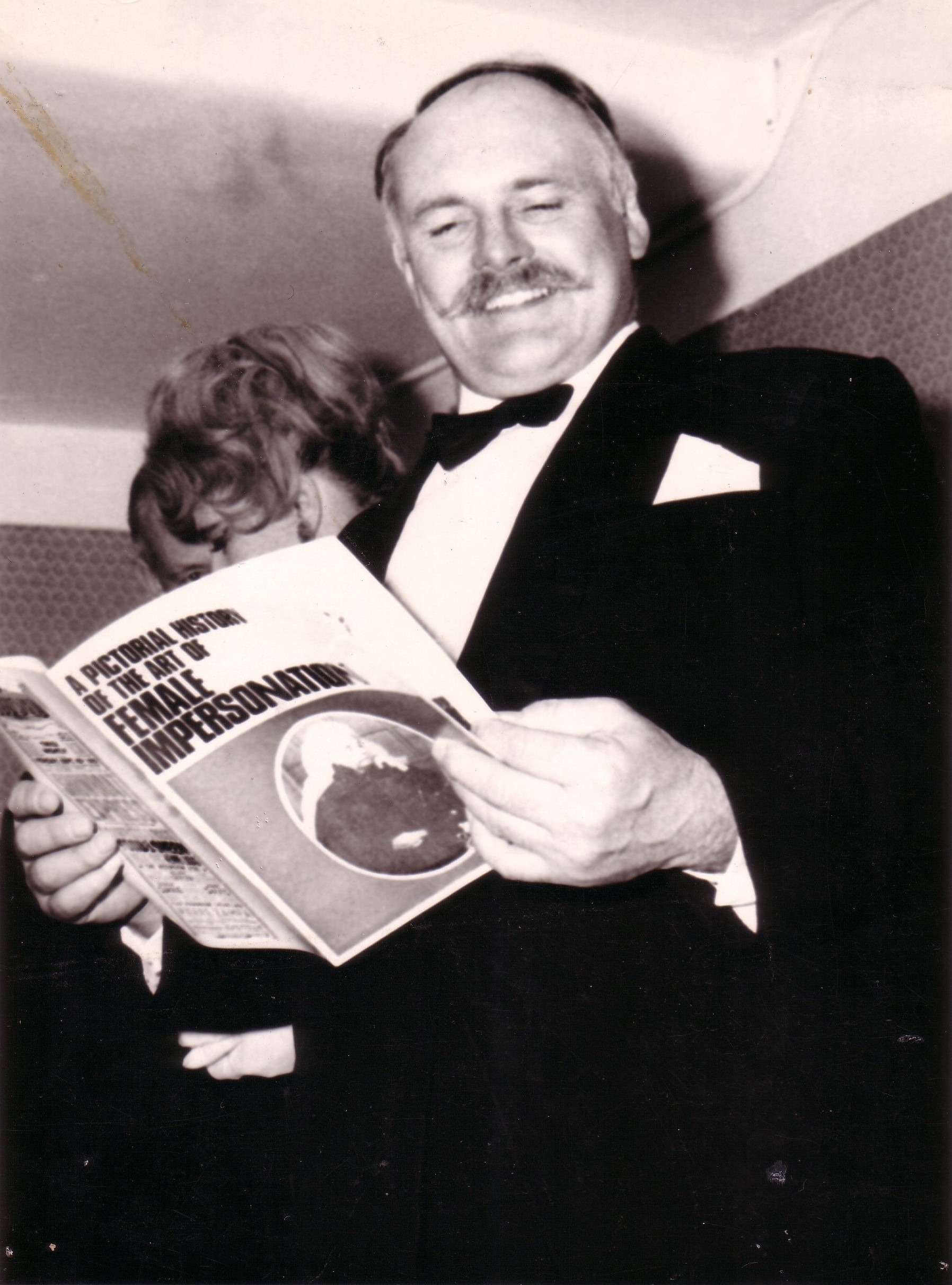
Jimmy Edwards

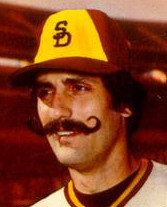
Rollie Fingers

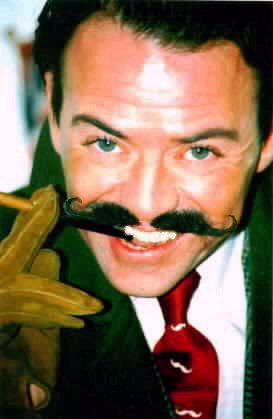
Michael Attree

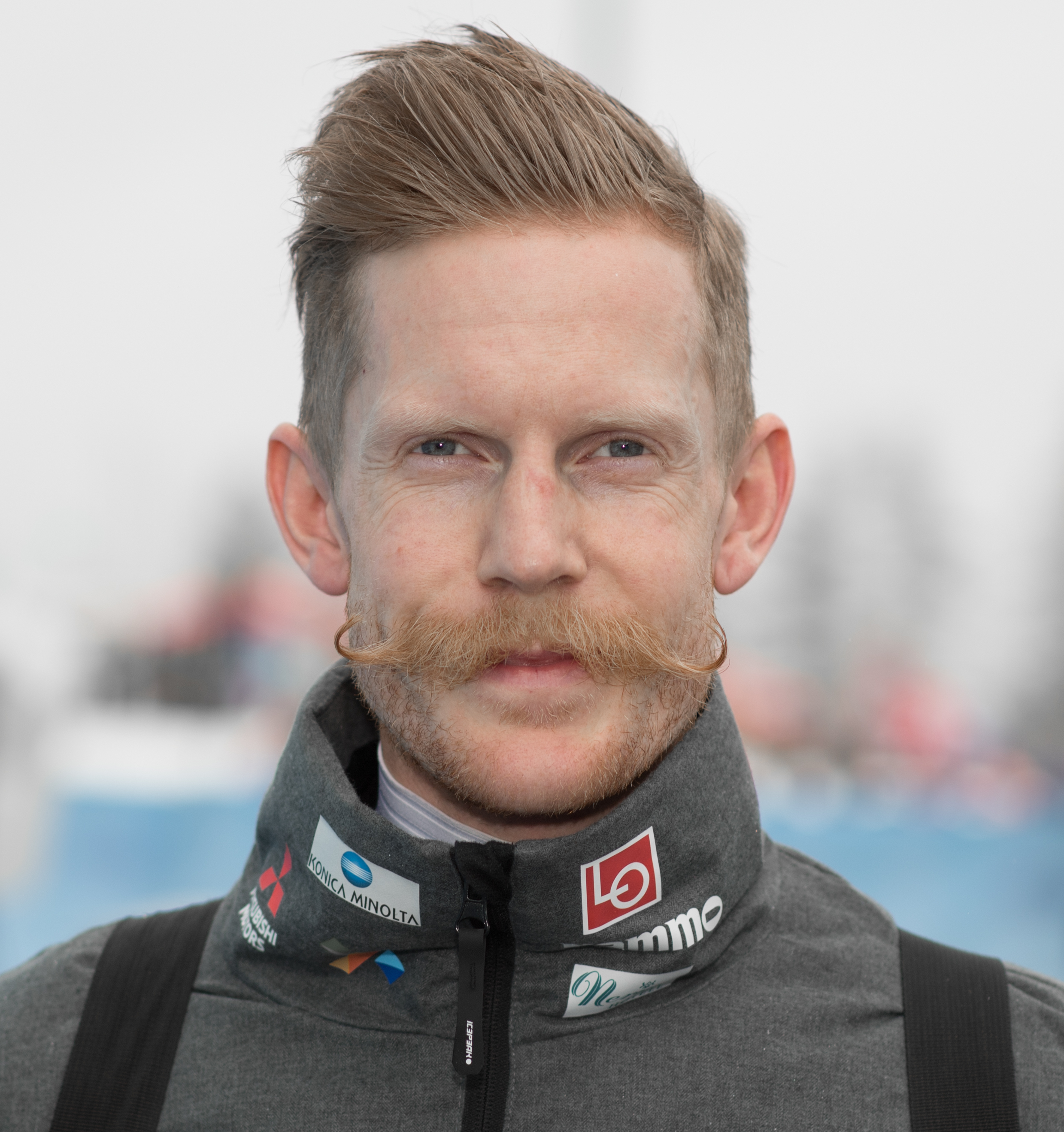
Robert Johansson

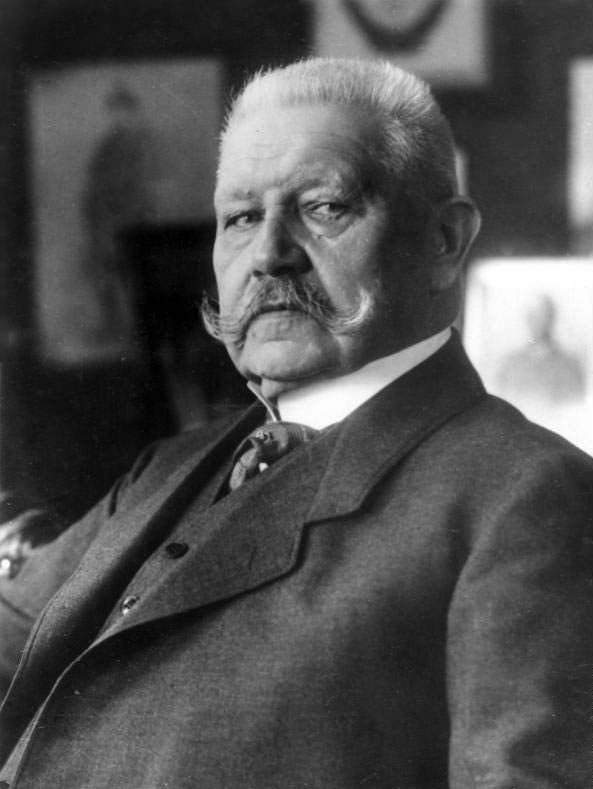
Paul von Hindenburg

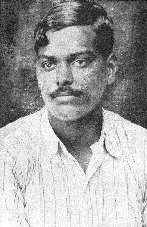
Chandra Shekhar Azad

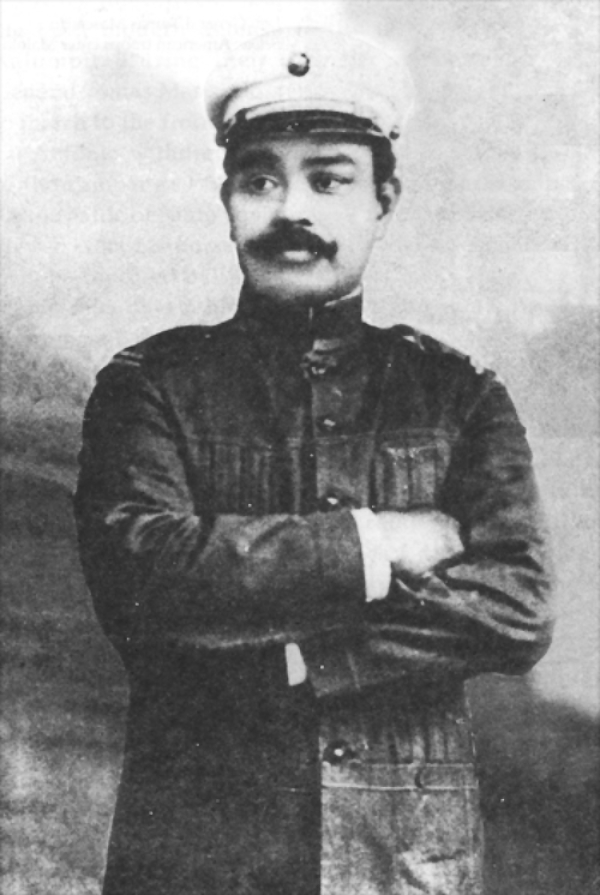
Antonio Luna

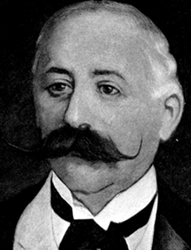
Maurice de Hirsch

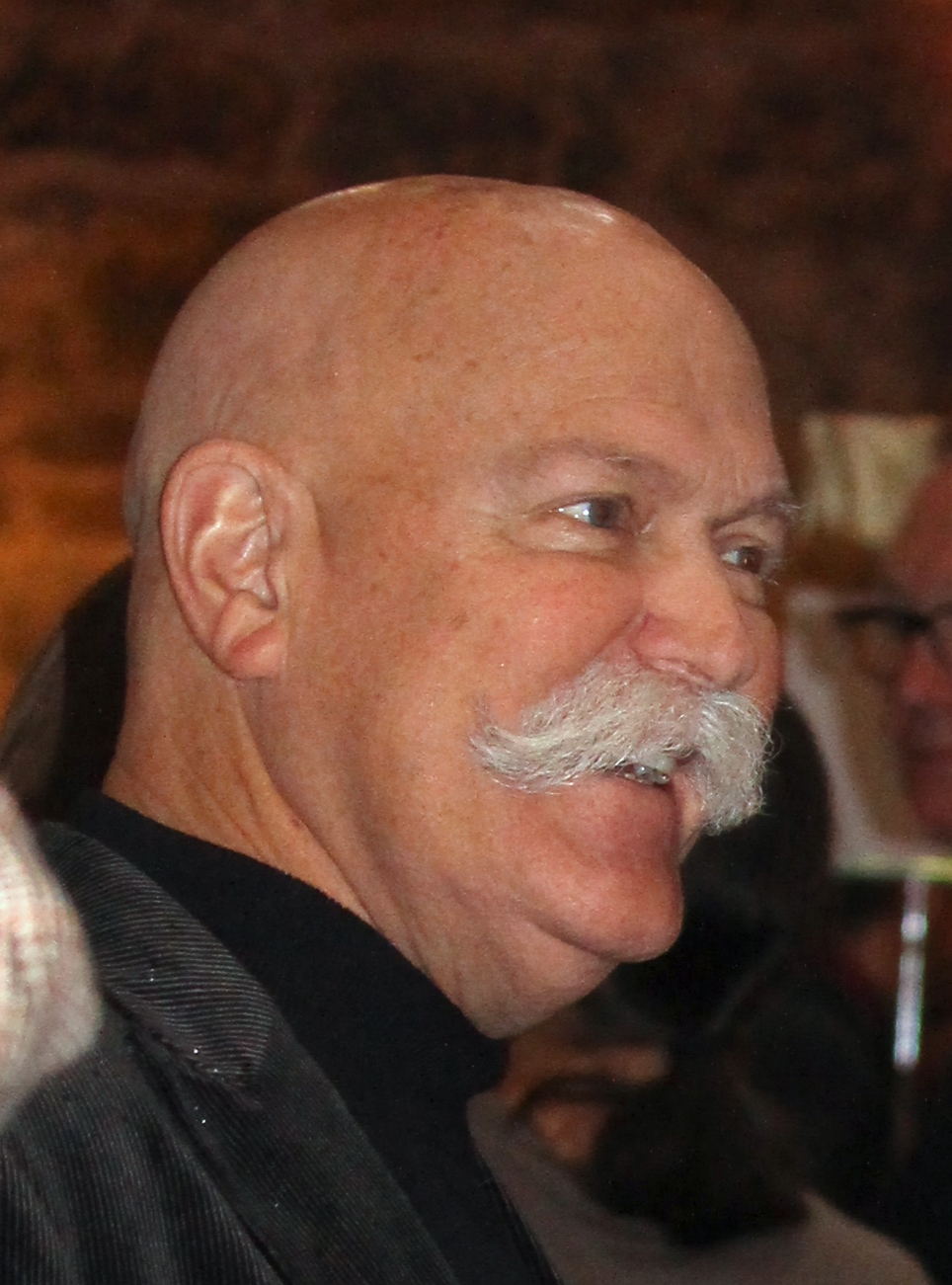
Will Vinton

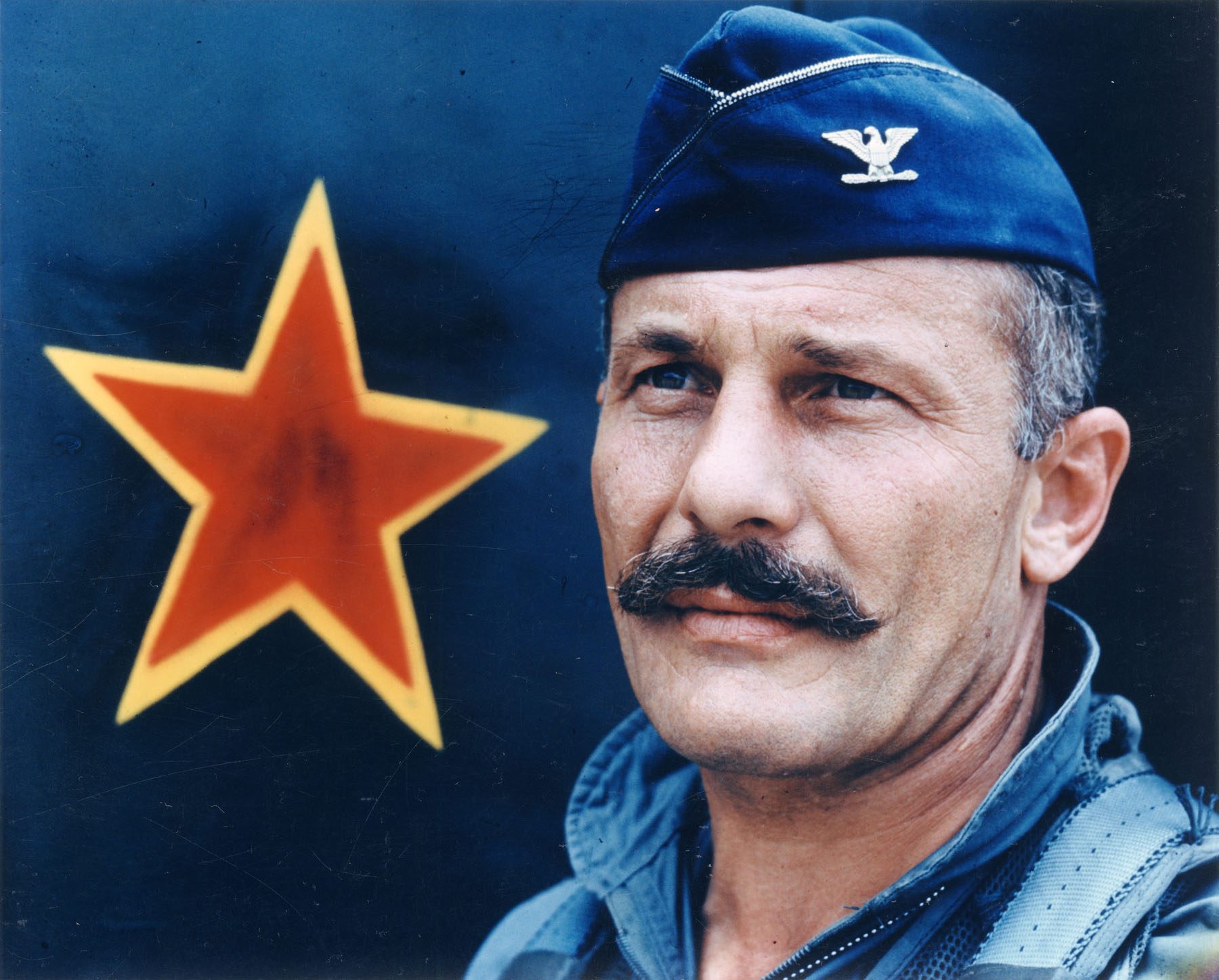
Robin Olds

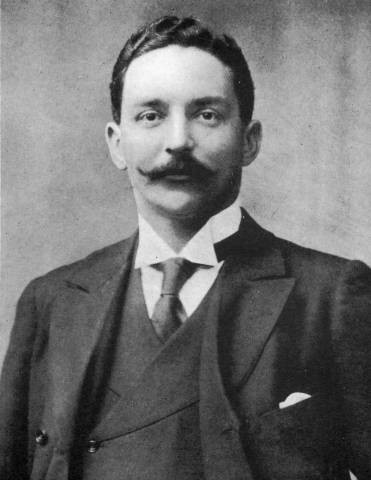
J. Bruce Ismay

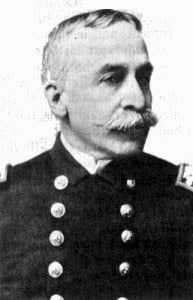
George Dewey

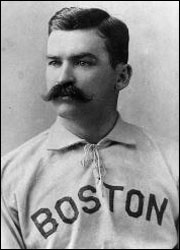
King Kelly

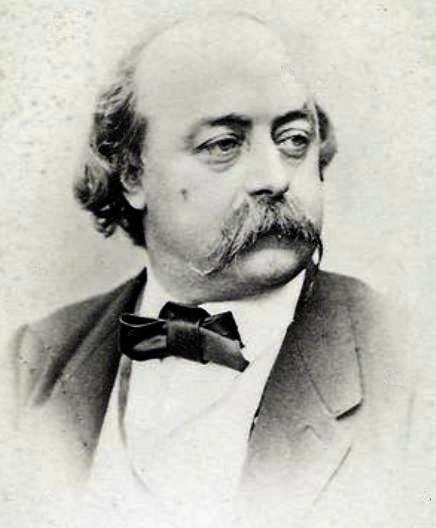
Gustave Flaubert

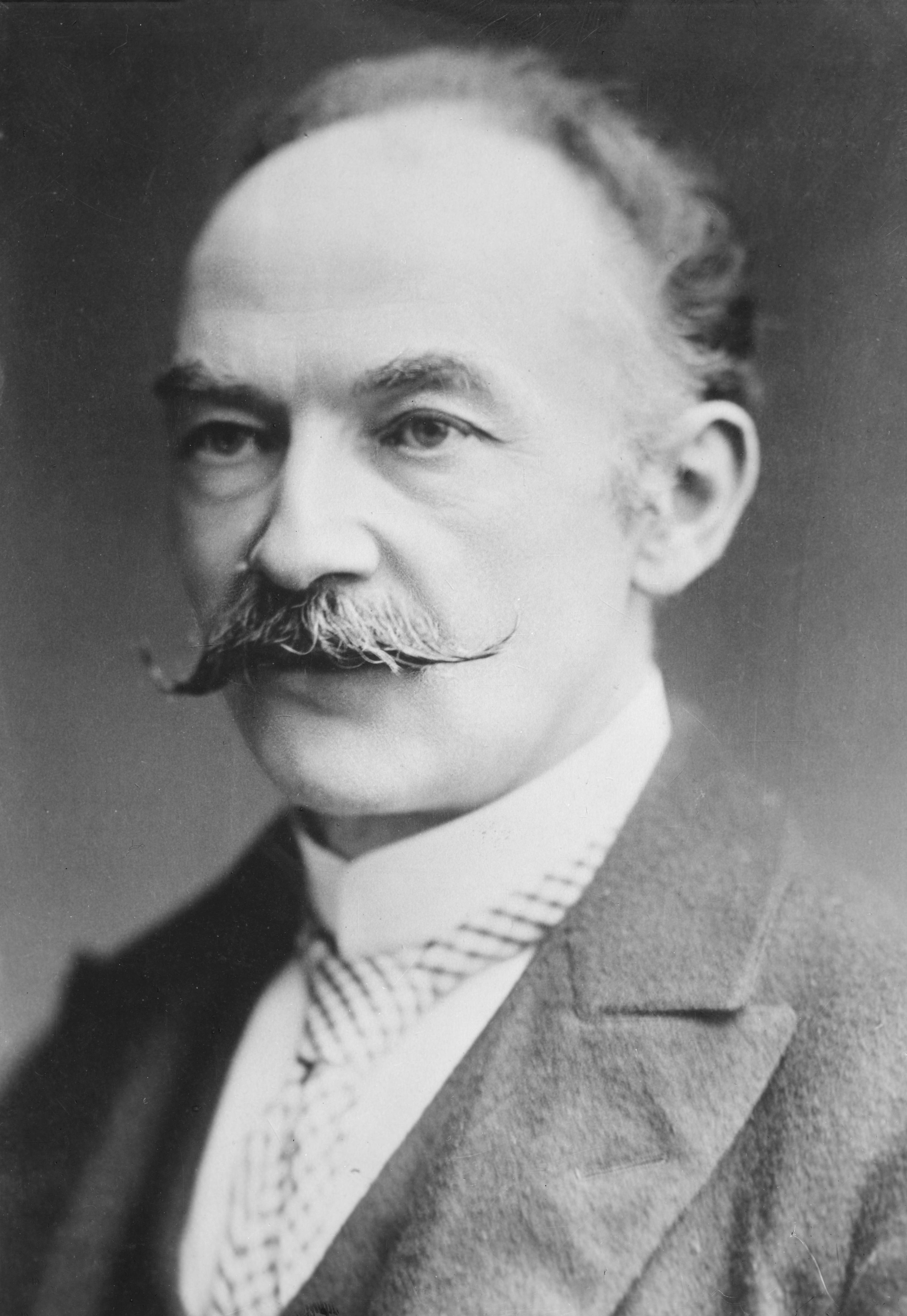
Thomas Hardy

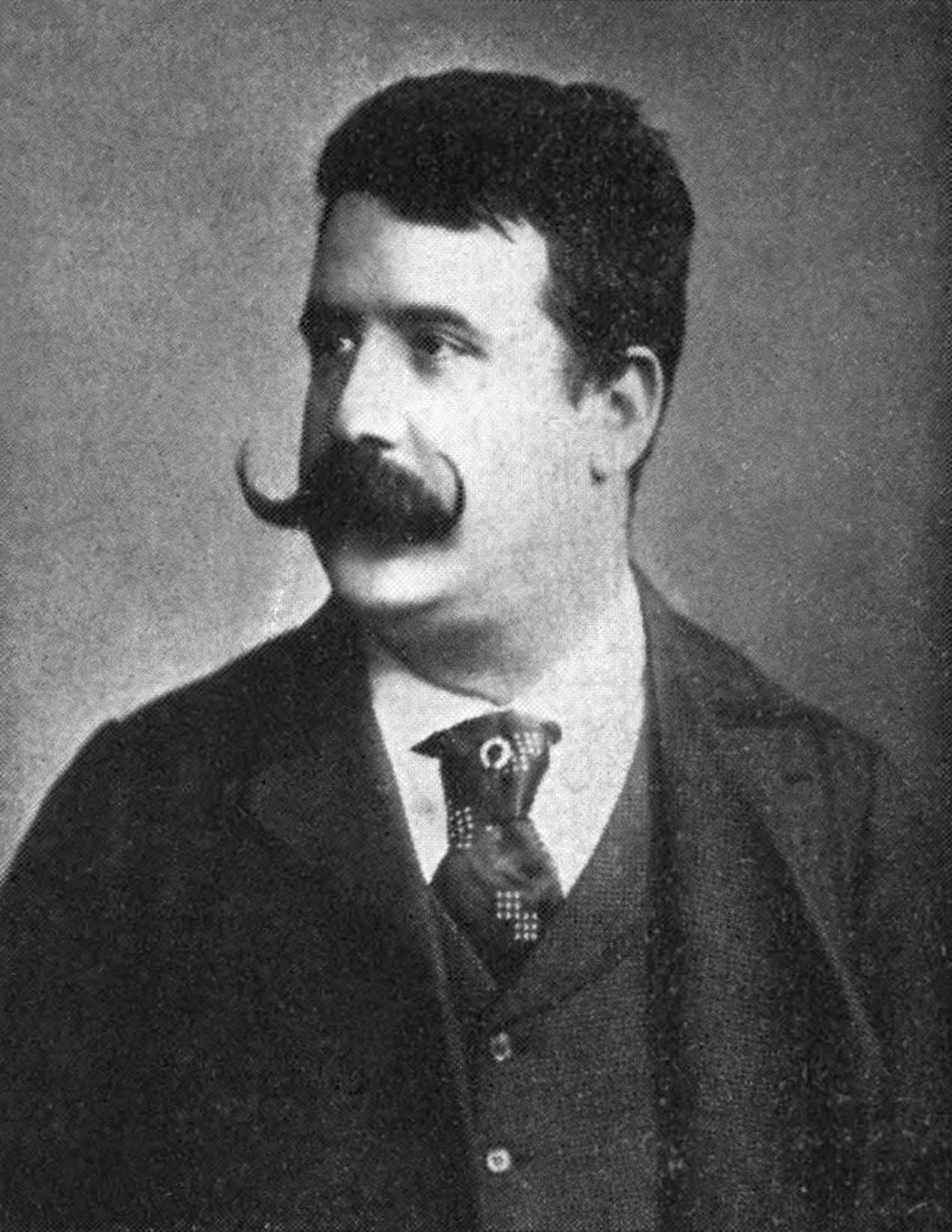
Ruggero Leoncavallo

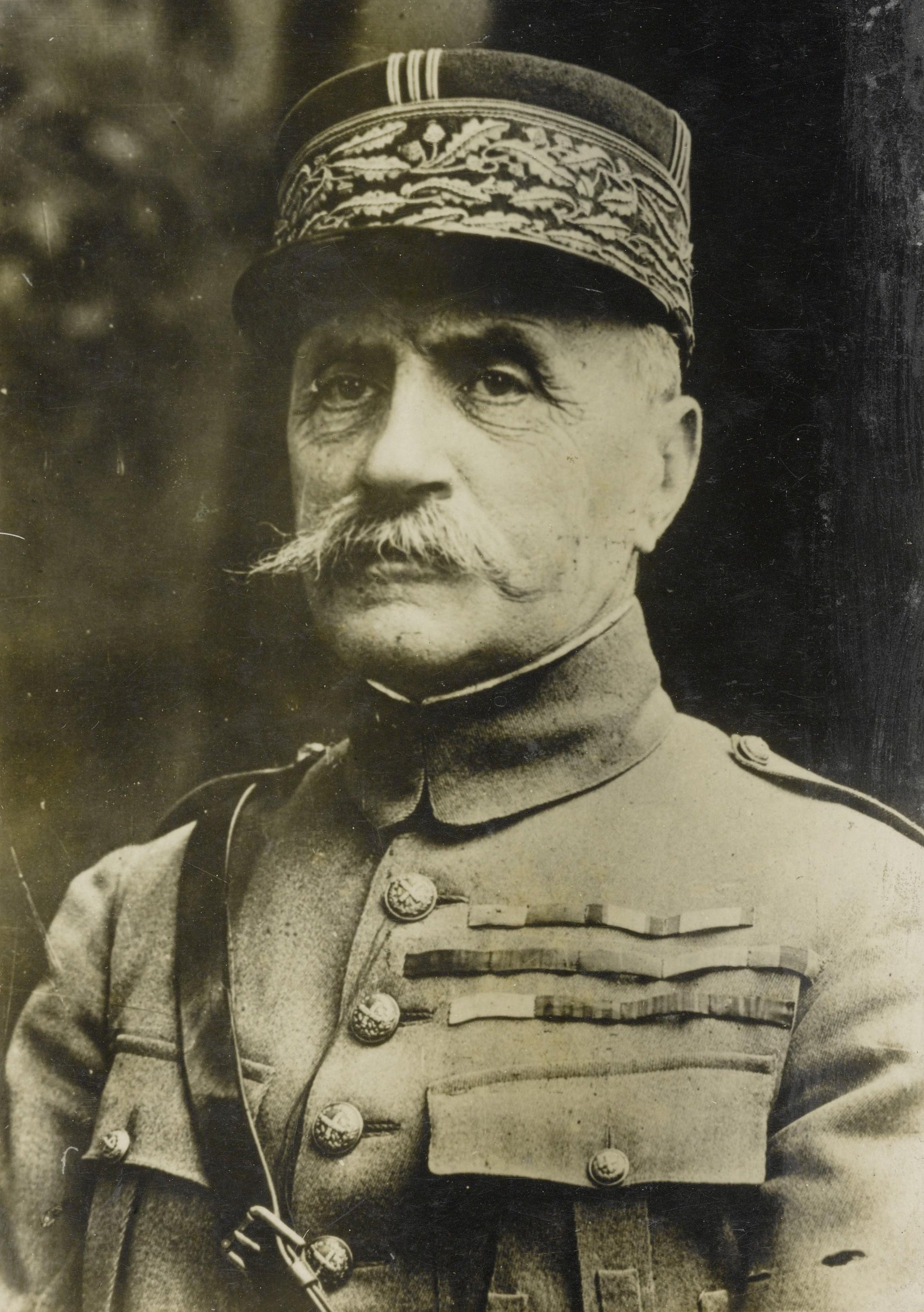
Ferdinand Foch

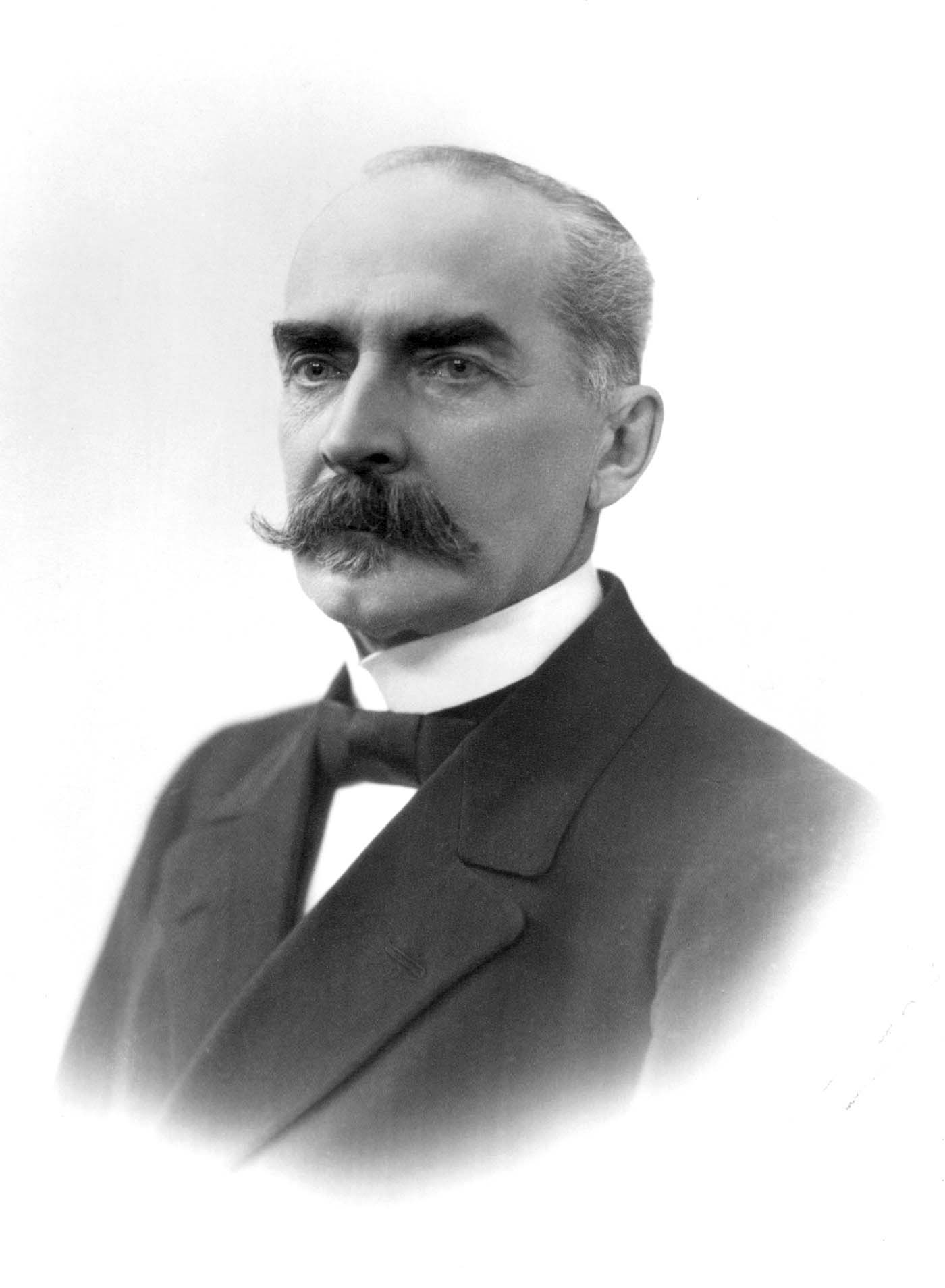
Kaarlo Juho Ståhlberg

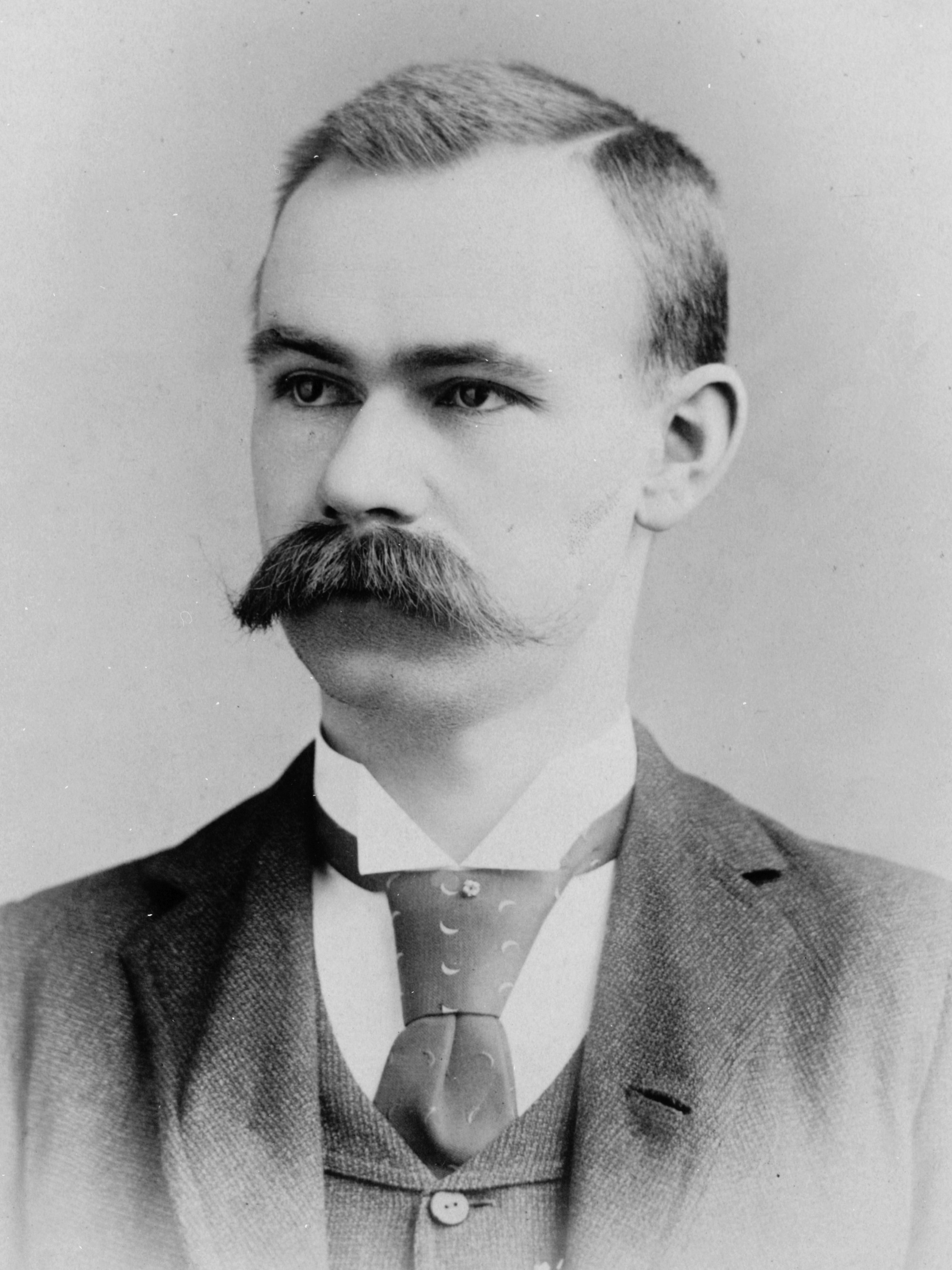
Herman Hollerith

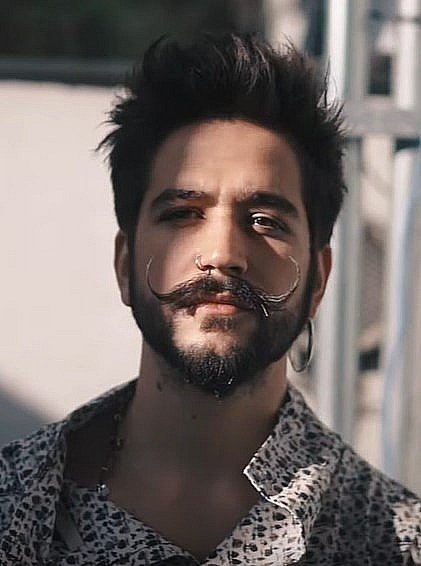
Camilo

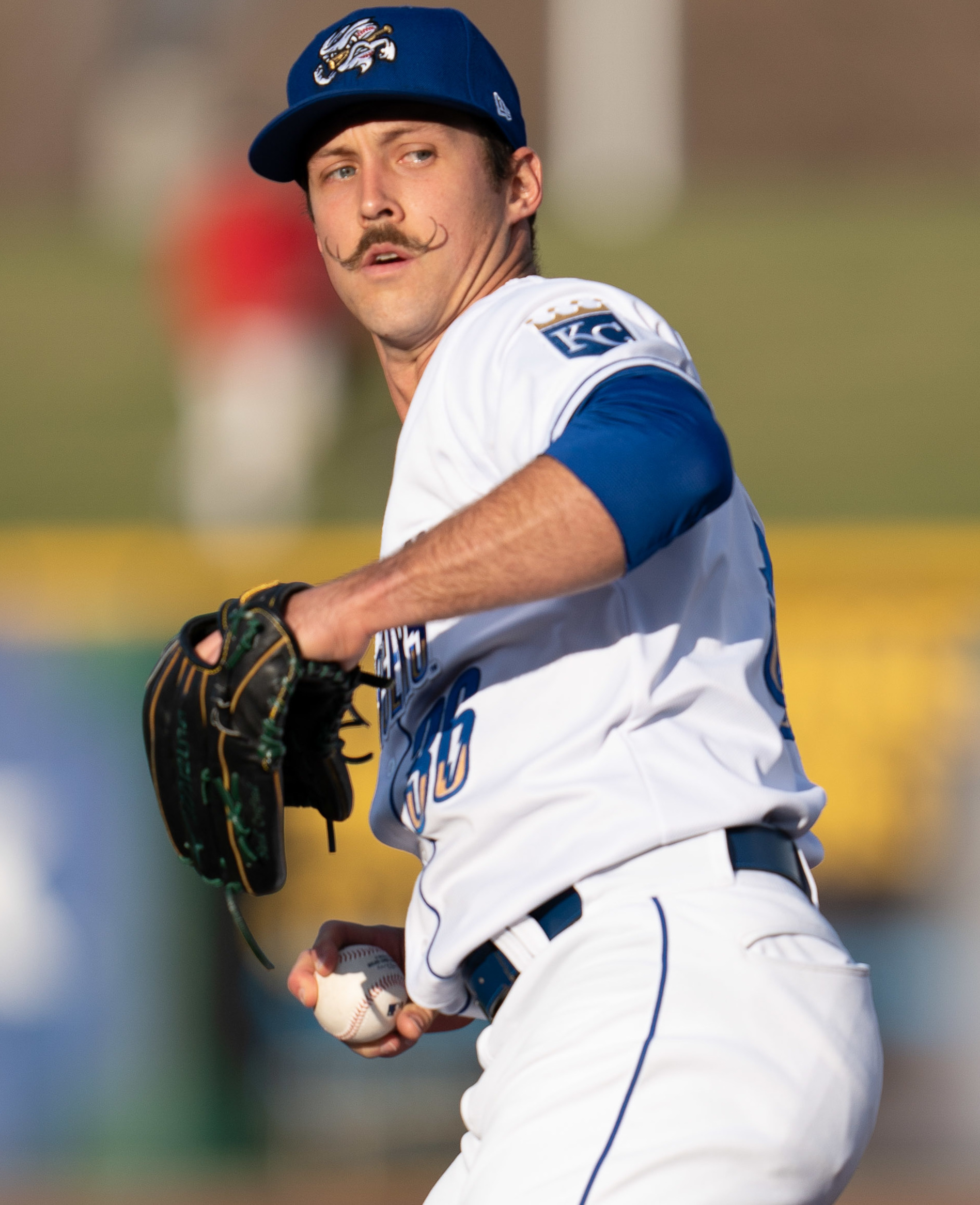
Daniel Mengden

==== Company mascots ====
- Julius Pringles
- Mr. Monopoly
- Mr. Boh
- Air India's Maharaja mascot
- Terrible Herbst

== Styles ==
This style is usually achieved by the use of moustache wax, although hair gel, a curling iron, or natural curling can suffice. Generally, the greater the curl of the extremities, the more dramatic the appearance achieved. When worn without wax or grooming, the moustache style may more closely resemble a walrus moustache.

== See also ==
- List of moustache styles
- List of facial hairstyles
