= Handlebar Club =

Fashion club in London

The Handlebar Club
- Type: Gentlemen's club and moustache club
- Founded: 1947
- Founder: Rod Littlewood
- Headquarters: United Kingdom
- Owner: Rod Littlewood
- Website: handlebarclub.co.uk

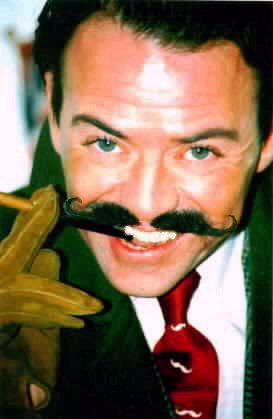
Club member Michael Attree sporting the ubiquitous hirsute appendage and club tie. Attree has been hailed by The Guardian as the Handlebar Club's "most rakish member".

The Handlebar Club is an association of aficionados of the handlebar moustache, based in London. The club's sole requirement for membership is "a hirsute appendage of the upper lip and with graspable extremities"; beards are absolutely forbidden. The club engages in activism to assuage discrimination against the handlebarred as well as competitive facial hair tourneys, and has inspired the foundation of transatlantic and Scandinavian counterparts. The club declares itself to be at war with a society that demands people choose "the bland, the boring and the generic"; a club chant includes the proposition that being kissed by a smooth face is akin to "meat without the salt".

The world's oldest whisker club, the Handlebar Club was founded in a London pub in April 1947 by a convivial gathering of ten, including raconteurs Jimmy Edwards and Frank Muir as well as sports commentator Raymond Glendenning. Their stated intention was to show that "men with moustaches are men of good character", and the mustachioed cohort resolved to meet monthly for "sport, conviviality" and charitable engagements. Enormous moustaches were quite popular among the flying officers of the Royal Air Force in the Second World War, and in founding the club Edwards sought to perpetuate the custom. The Strand Magazine greeted the establishment as "an indication that Handlebars have outlived their time", interpreting the preponderance of "men with a distinctive type of face-wear" banding together as a sign of weakness.

== History ==
The club was founded in April 1947 in the dressing room of comedian Jimmy Edwards at the Windmill Theatre in London. There were 10 founder members, including Edwards, Raymond Glendenning, and Frank Muir. The minutes of that first meeting are in the Club archives and it appears that although there was a goodly number of founder members they were outnumbered by chorus girls.

The object of the club was, and still is, to bring together moustache wearers (beards being strictly prohibited) socially for sport and general conviviality. The aim of the club was to assist by all means at its disposal, any worthy charity or cause, particularly those devoted to ex-servicemen. This aim still remains today and it has helped particularly with children's charities.

== Meetings ==
Ever since the early days of the club, it has held a London meeting on the first Friday of the month, and for over ten years the venue has been The Windsor Castle Pub on Crawford Place, after its closure in September 2016 it moved to the Heron Bar & Restaurant, Norfolk Crescent, W2 2DN. The Heron is jammed packed with memorabilia from the former Windsor Castle along with pictures from the Handlebar Club's 70-year history adorning the walls.

== See also ==
- Beard Liberation Front
- Gentlemen's club
- The Chap
- World Beard and Moustache Championships
