= World Beard and Moustache Championships =

Biennial facial hair competition

The World Beard and Moustache Championships (WBMC) is a biennial competition overseen by the World Beard and Moustache Association (WBMA), in which men with beards and moustaches display lengthy, highly styled facial hair.

== Contest synopsis ==
Since 2004, the WBMA has been the governing body for the championships. This association is fully responsible for awarding the contest to member clubs. Any club may apply for membership to the WBMA and applications to host an upcoming WBMC will be accepted from established clubs.

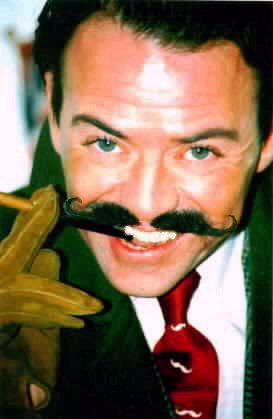
Michael "Atters" Attree, chairman and compere of the 2007 UK event, sporting his renowned handlebar moustache.

The first championship took place in Höfen an der Enz, Germany, in 1990.

Since 2007 the official World Beard and Moustache Championships have been held every two years, on odd years only.

On September 1, 2007, competitors of the world's most hirsute faces from the UK, America, Germany and other countries convened for the championships in Brighton. It was hosted by the Handlebar Club with comedy performer Michael "Atters" Attree acting as chairman and master of ceremonies. Facial hair categories were judged by celebrity moustache-wearers including actor/singer Nick Cave and musician/poet Billy Childish. The international event was staged within the Brighton Centres Main Hall. Categories include Dali moustache, goatee and full beard freestyle.

The 2009 event was hosted by the South Central Alaska Beard and Moustache Club from May 19 to 24 in Anchorage, Alaska. SCAKBMC distributed over $16,000 to local charities via the International Lions Club 49A foundation 501C4 and the Miners & Trappers Ball Inc a 501C3 organizations. Anchorage hosted the most ever competitors, eclipsing the previous U.S. venue of Carson City, Nevada. A 50-minute British documentary named Tashalaska followed that year's freestyle moustache (Keith "Gandhi Jones" Haubrich), Chinese moustache (Ted Sedman) and freestyle full beard (David Traver) winners.

The 2011 championships were hosted by the Norwegian Moustache Club of 91 in Trondheim, Norway on May 15. The 12th incarnation of the contest was held near Stuttgart, Germany on November 2, 2013 and was hosted by Belle Moustache Beard and Culture Club. The World Beard and Moustache Championships were held in Leogang, Austria in 2015.

The championships returned to America during the first 3 days of September 2017 when the Austin Facial Hair Club hosted the contest in Austin, Texas, which was the largest world championships to date with 738 registered competitors from 33 countries.

In May 2019, the WBMC was held in Antwerp, Belgium, hosted by Snorrenclub Antwerpen.

Due to the COVID-19 pandemic, the 2021 championships were postponed until 2023, tentatively pushing back the previously scheduled 2023 Bristol, England competition to 2025.

New Zealand had to cancel their bid and pull out of the event, leaving it open for proposals. The 2023 championships were eventually held in June in Burghausen, Germany, hosted by Ostbayerischer Bart- und Schnauzerclub.The next WBMC was held in July 2025 in Pittsburgh, Pennsylvania, hosted by the Mad Viking Pennsylvania Beard Club, and the 2027 WBMC will be held in Blackpool, England, hosted by the Sandgrown Beardsmen.

== Categories ==
There are three brackets of facial hair: moustache, partial beard, and full beard. Each bracket is broken into individual categories. There are usually 17 categories but there were 18 different categories for the 2009, 2013 & 2015 championships, and a 27 categories for 2017, including for the first time 4 "craft beard" (ladies / "whiskerina") categories. A new category for 1 cm (0.39 in) short carved beards was introduced in 2013 and repeated in 2015 called the "trend beard", which is in its own bracket.

=== Moustache ===
- Natural moustache – maximum of 1.5 cm (0.59 in) beyond the end of the upper lip (may be styled but without aides)
- English – slender, hairs extremely long and pulled to the side
- Dali – slender with long tips, straight up or arching up
- Imperial moustache – small and bushy with tips arching up
- Hungarian – big and bushy, beginning from the middle of the upper lip and pulled to the side
- Freestyle – all moustaches that do not match other classes

=== Partial beard ===
- Natural goatee – facial hair grown only on chin, upper and lower lip (may be styled but without aides). In 2015 a freestyle goatee category was added in addition to the freestyle sideburn category.
- Chinese – chin shaved with moustache tips long and pulled down
- Musketeer – moustache long and slender, beard small and pointed
- Imperial – hair to be grown only on cheeks and upper lip
- Sideburns freestyle – all other sideburns with shaved chin
- Alaskan whaler – beard with no moustache
- Partial beard freestyle – all partial beards not matching other classes

=== Full beard ===
- Verdi – short and round, length not to exceed 10 cm
- Garibaldi – broad, full and round, length not to exceed 20 cm
- Natural Full beard – as grown, no aids allowed
- Natural full beard with styled moustache – as grown, only moustache can be styled with aides
- Full beard freestyle – full beards not matching other classes, but considered the most creative over all other categories in the full beards.

=== Ladies categories ===
- Creative Moustache (2017, 2019, 2025)
- Realistic Moustache
- Realistic Partial Beard (2023, 2025)
- Creative Beard (2017, 2019, 2025)
- Realistic Beard
- Realistic Freestyle Beard (2023, 2025)

== Examples of winners ==
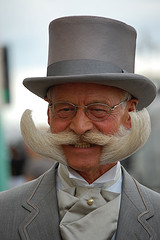
Karl Heinz-Hille, winner in Imperial Partial Beard category at the 2007 Championship

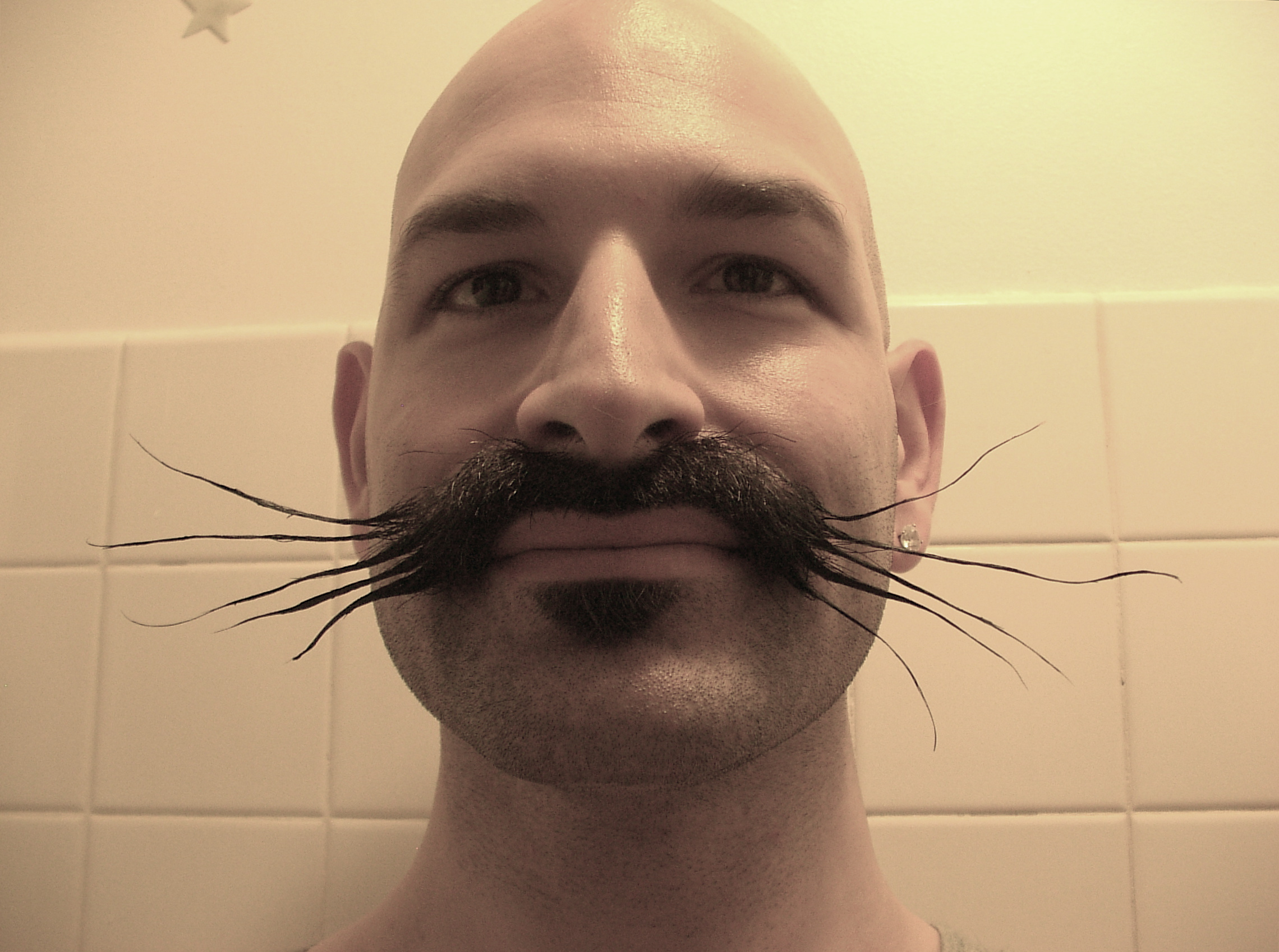
Gandhi Jones, 1st-place winner in the Freestyle Moustache category, in 2007, 2009 and 2011

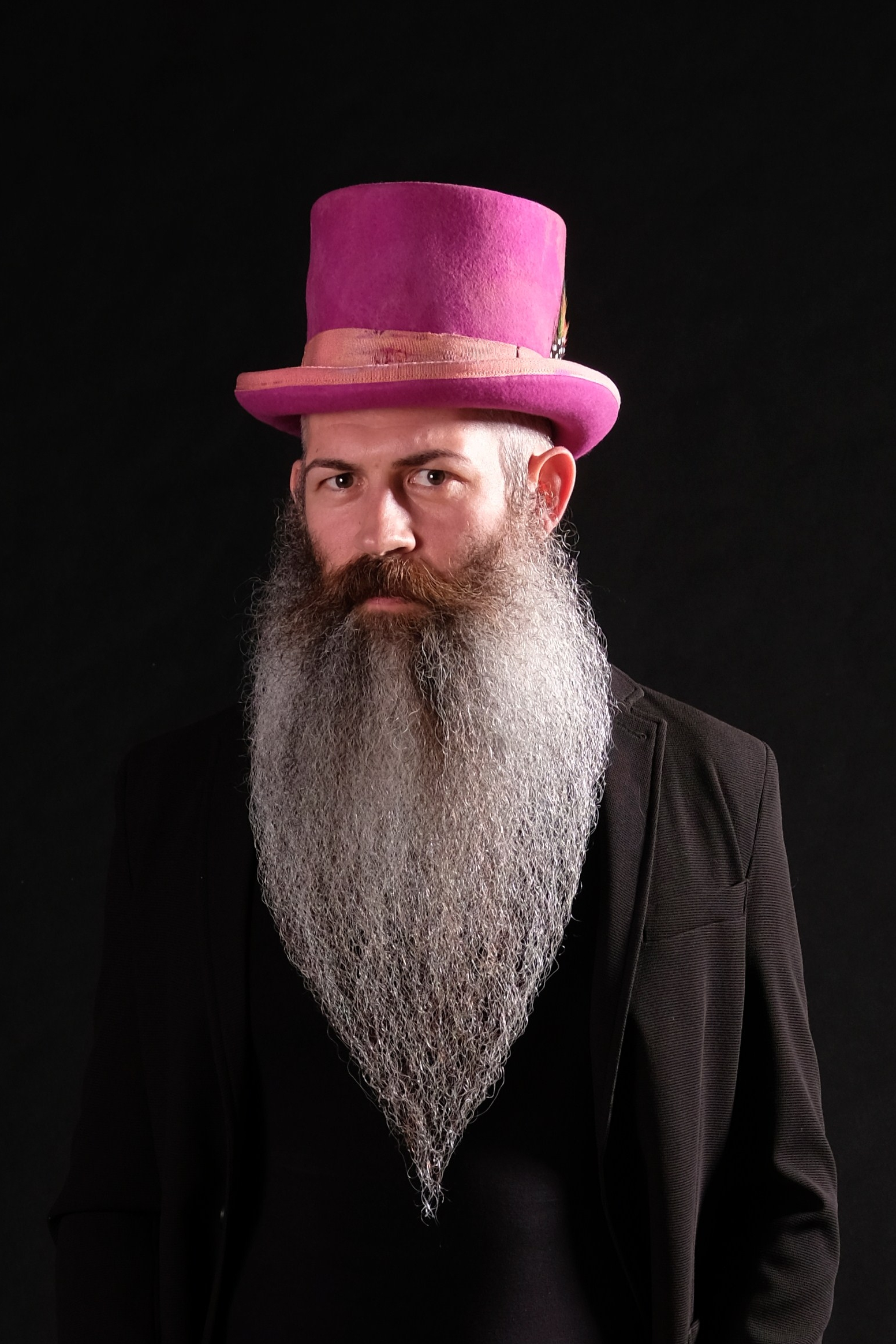
Fabrizio Bottos winner in natural beard category at the 2019 and 2023 Championship
