= Michael Attree =

British humourist and performer

Michael "Atters" Attree
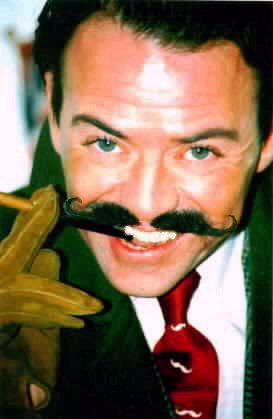
- Born: 22 April 1965 (age 61); Colchester Military Hospital
- Occupations: Satirist, comedy writer, performer, comedian
- Website: https://www.atters.com

Michael "Atters" Attree (born 22 April 1965 in Colchester Military Hospital) is a British humourist and performer.

== Early life ==
Attree was born to British colonial parents who met in East Africa during the early 1950s. He was born in Colchester. He studied Fine Art & Film at Saint Martins School of Art.

== Career ==
Attree writes as the editor at large for the satirical magazine The Chap. His feature interviews have included Leslie Phillips, Sir Patrick Moore, Brian Blessed, Alan Moore and Jilly Cooper, while his ongoing column "The Pentagram of Atters" contains information regarding the supernatural. Attree is a campaigner and activist within the "Chap movement". In his book London Calling: A Countercultural History of London since 1945, Barry Miles recalls how Attree (along with two colleagues) climbed to the top of a Rachel Whiteread art installation as part of a "Tate Modern Protest".

Attree has contributed to publications such as Time Out and The Guardian and erotic comedy for magazines such as Penthouse Forum, Erotic Knave (as "The Knave") and Erotic Review. He was also Flux magazines Paranormal Investigations Editor and contributes to magazines specific to the subject of the paranormal.

In the late 80s, Janet Street-Porter (then head of BBC Youth and Entertainment Features) commissioned Attree to work as a producer/director for BBC TV. He later worked as a documentaries producer for Channel Four.

His theatre show Atters Attree’s Chap-orgasmic Terrors is a sci-fi/horror/conspiracy theory comedy spin off of his former Flux magazine series and was performed as part of the Brighton Festival Fringe. Le Figaro magazine states: "Anarcho-dandy, Michael Attree is a revolutionary cell in a three-piece suit who cherishes the dream of overthrowing the Western consumer society."

== Other interests ==
Attree was chairman and host compère of the World Beard and Moustache Championships 2007, held at the Brighton Centre and hosted the British Beard & Moustache Championships 2012 held at the Brighton Dome. He is a committee member of London's Handlebar Club and was the editor of the club's journal for a number of years. He is also a master of ceremonies performer within the fields of neo-burlesque.

== See also ==
- Beard Liberation Front
