= Facial hair in the military =

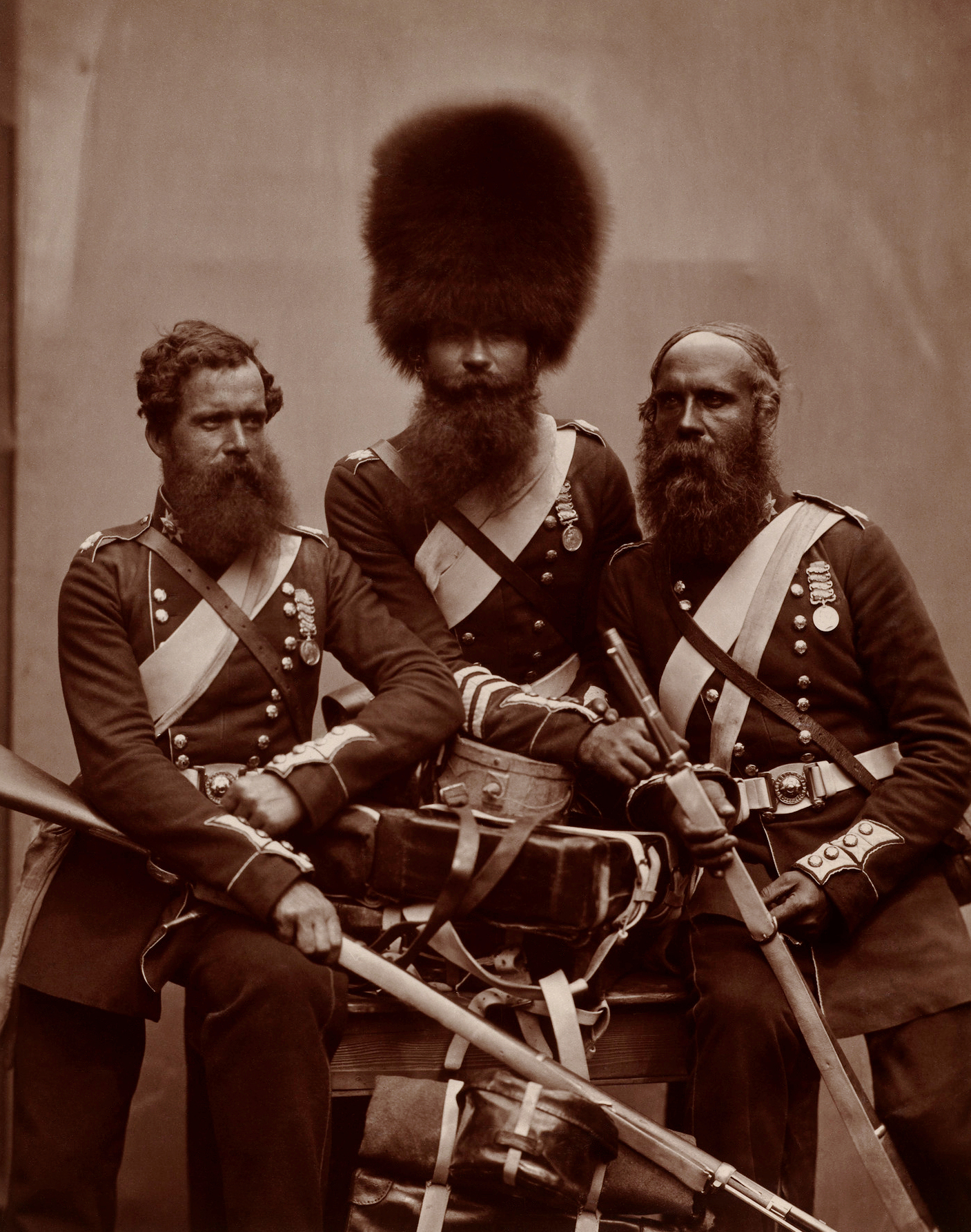
During the 19th century, soldiers and officers sported various type of moustaches, goatees, beards or sideburns. Pictured: Coldstream Guards returning from the Crimean War.

Facial hair in the military has been at various times standard, prohibited, or an integral part of the uniform.

== Asia ==
=== India ===
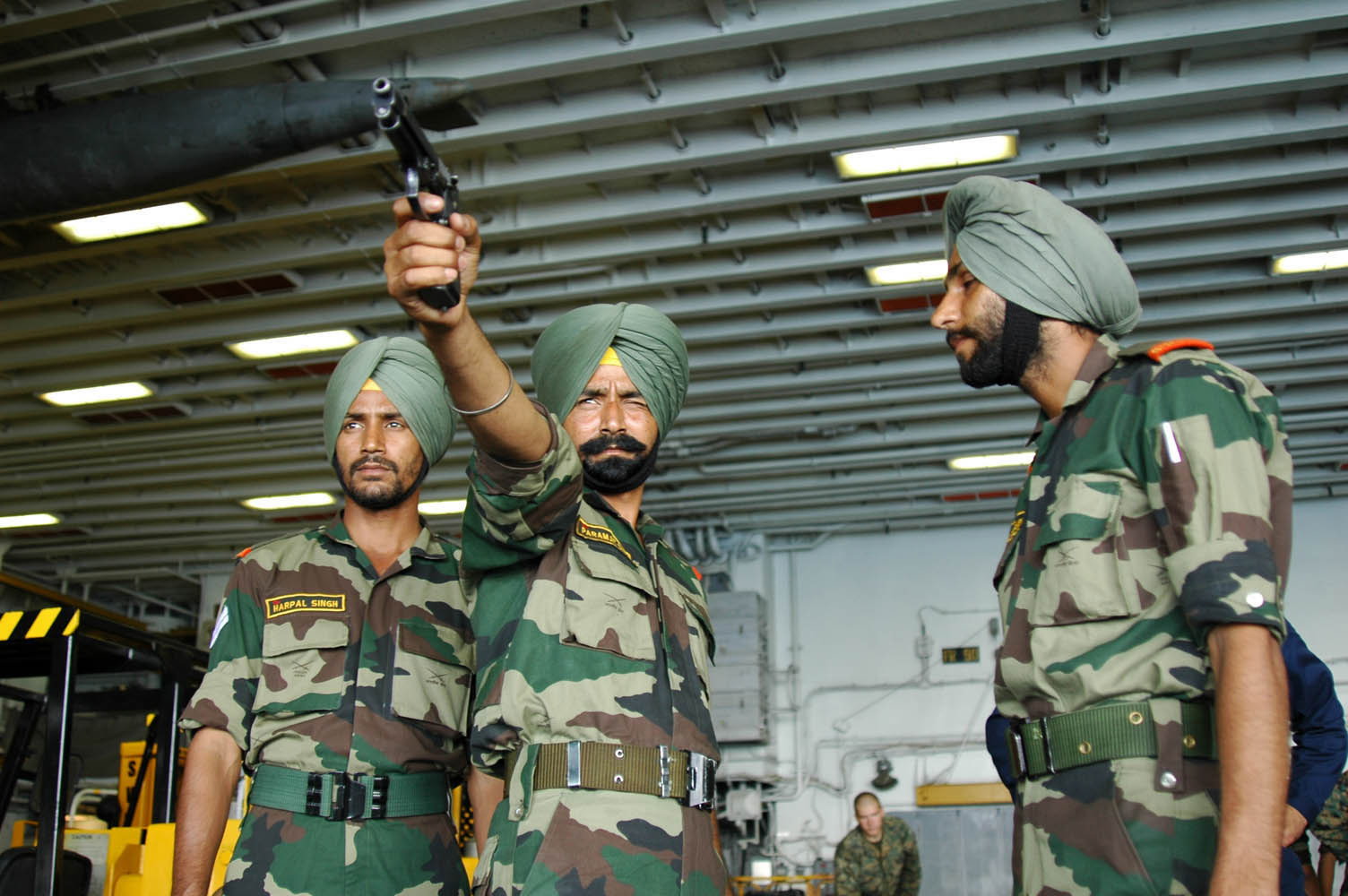
Sikhs are permitted to wear full beards in the Indian military

In the Indian Armed Forces, male Sikh service members are allowed to wear full beards as their religion expressly requires followers to do so. However, they are specifically required to "dress up their hair and beard properly".

Non-Sikh personnel are allowed to grow whiskers and mustaches, with the only regulation being that they "will be of moderate length". In December 2003, the Supreme Court of India ruled that Muslims in uniform could grow beards, although the rules have since been changed again (via a Supreme Court ruling in 2018) to once again allow only Sikhs to wear beards. Thus, non-Sikhs serving in the Indian Army or Indian Air Force are not permitted to wear beards. However, Army personnel on active duty are sometimes exempt from facial hair regulations for the duration of their tour of duty if their deployment makes access to such facilities difficult. Indian Navy personnel are allowed to grow beards subject to the permission of their commanding officer.

Exceptions for other religions are made in the case of special forces operatives such as the Indian Army's Para (Special Forces), who are allowed to grow beards.

=== Iran ===
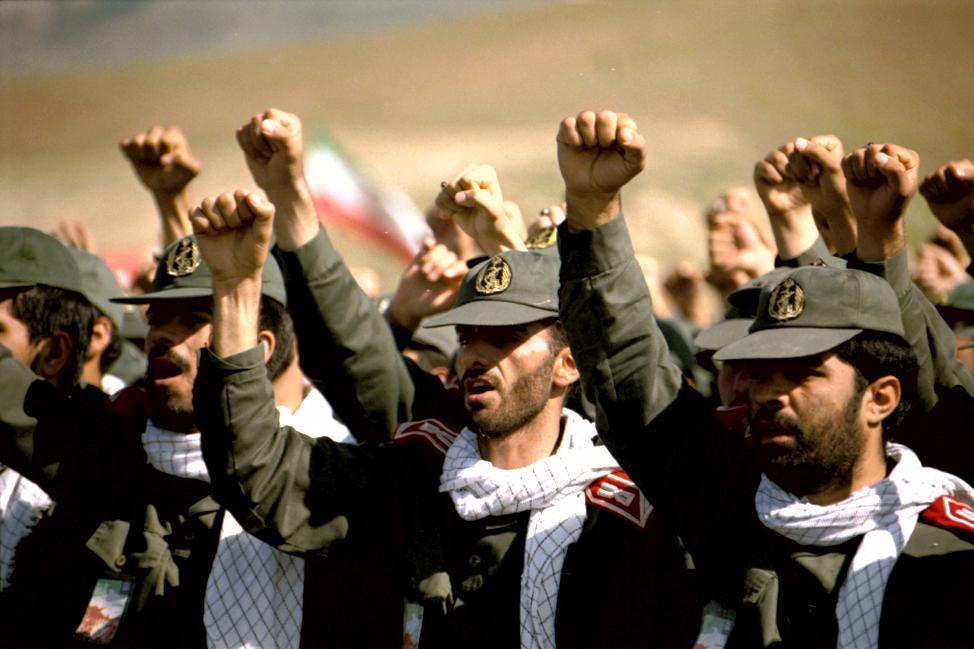
Bearded members of the Islamic Revolutionary Guard Corps during a military ceremony in 1998

Beards are permitted in the Armed Forces of the Islamic Republic of Iran. As a sign of their ideological motivation, Islamic Revolutionary Guard Corps (Sepah) personnel used to tend to wear full beards; in contrast, the Islamic Republic of Iran Army (Artesh) personnel are usually trimmed or wear mustaches.

=== Iraq ===
Beards to a certain length were traditionally permitted in the Iraqi Armed Forces; however, a ban was brought into effect in April 2012 due to public associations between beards and certain sectarian militias in Iraq. As a result of the change, Iraqi soldiers must now be clean shaven. Under the dictatorship of Saddam Hussein, beards were not allowed in the army or during military service; only mustaches were permitted.

=== Israel ===
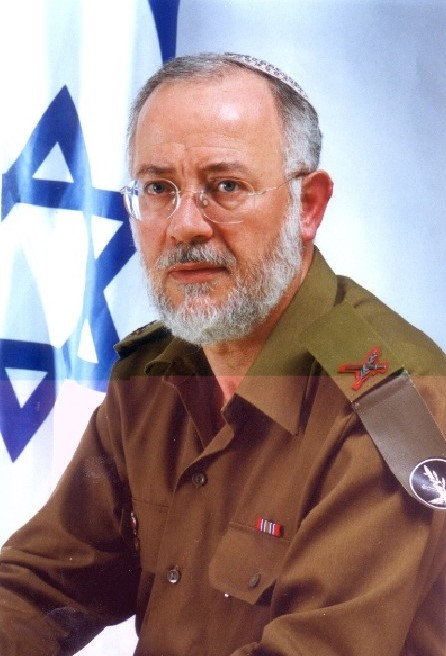
A bearded Orthodox rabbi of the Israel Defence Force

The IDF used to prohibit the growing of facial hair unless a special request form has been filed and approved. The requests could be for religious reasons (full beard only, see Shaving in Judaism), health reasons such as acne (no restrictions on facial hair styles), and on the grounds of "free will", which means the facial hair (mustache, a goatee or a full beard all of which must be well groomed) has to be part of the soldier's identity and part of his self-esteem. If the request is for health reasons, it must be approved by a military doctor and lasts up to six months. If the request is due to "free will", it must be approved by a unit commander at the rank of lieutenant colonel or above, and a recommendation must be made by an officer associated with the soldier at the rank of lieutenant (usually in a combat unit). For religious requests, the soldier is interviewed by a military rabbi to determine if they meet the criteria for an exemption. If approved, the officer associated with the soldier makes a recommendation, which is then approved by the unit commander, who must be at the rank of lieutenant colonel or higher. In the past, the exemption from shaving on religious grounds or due to "free will" lasted for the duration of the soldier's entire service. However, in 2020, the exemption from shaving had to be renewed annually, and it also expires if the soldier chooses to shave willingly. As of 2025, IDF soldiers are allowed beards without special approval.

=== Lebanon ===
Beards are not allowed in the Lebanese Armed Forces. Only trimmed moustaches that don't pass the upper lip are permitted, and a special allowance is paid as a result.

=== Pakistan ===
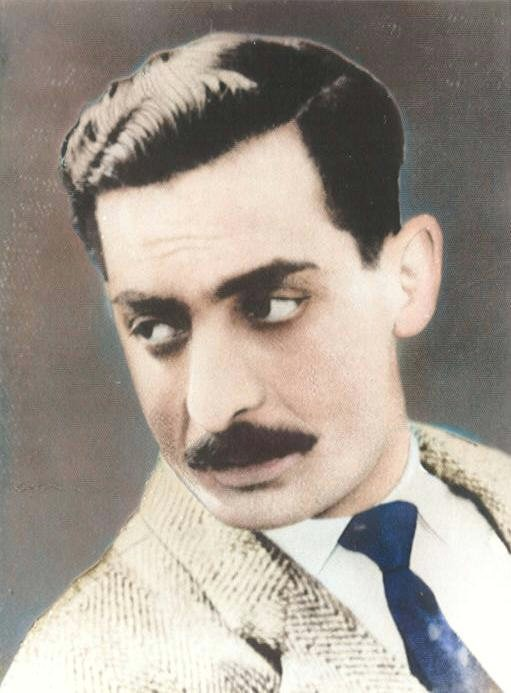
Squadron Leader Sarfaraz Rafiqui of the Pakistan Air Force.

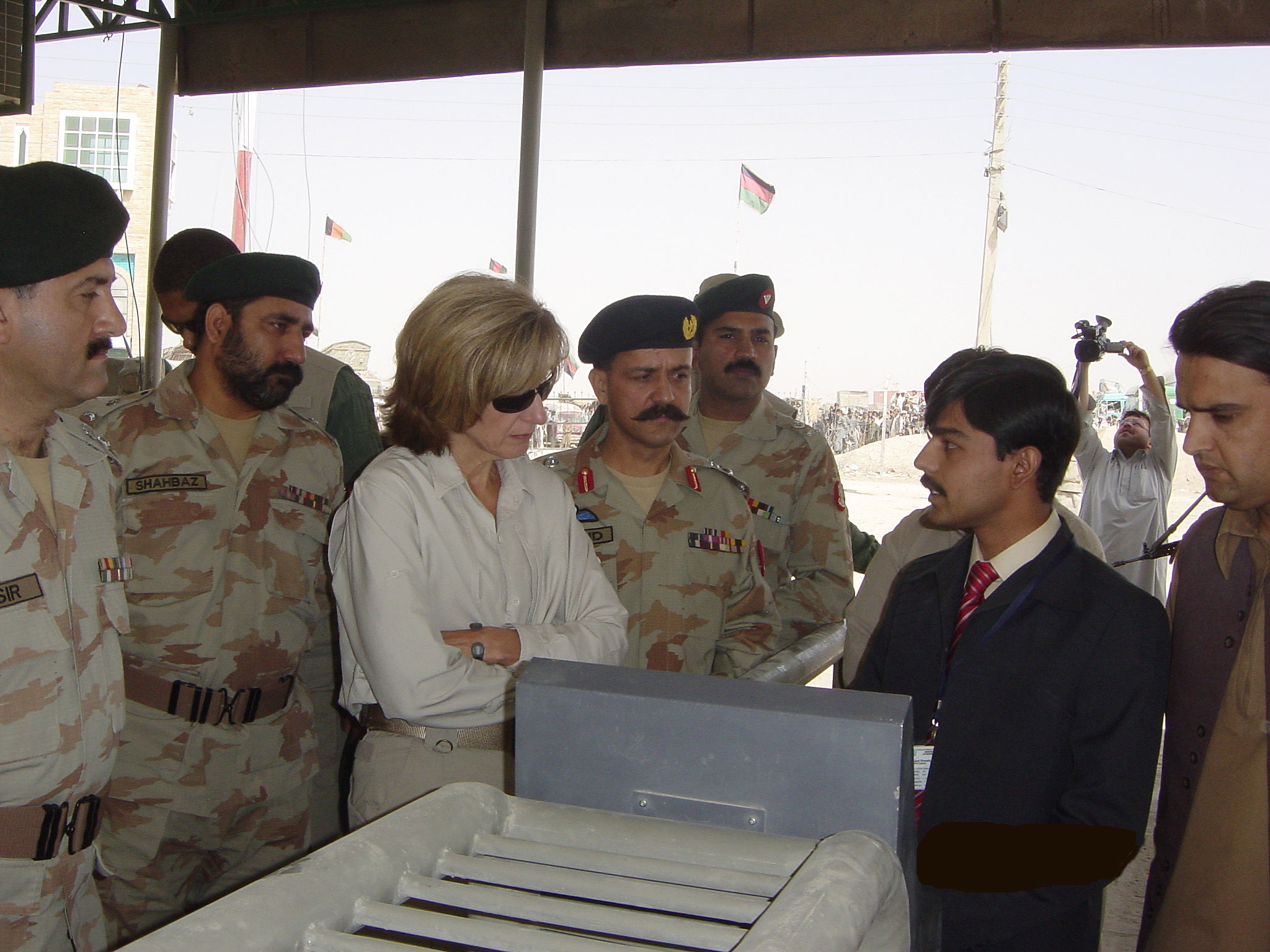
Military personnel and others with moustaches and beards, at the Afghanistan-Pakistan border.

Beards are permitted in the Pakistan Army. They are allowed only if a special request is approved. The requests are generally made for religious reasons or due to health concerns, such as acne or skin allergies. Once the form has been approved, the applicant is not allowed to shave back. There is a special allowance for bigger moustaches, but they must be neat and trimmed.

=== Philippines ===
Facial hair is prohibited in the Armed Forces of the Philippines. The regulation applies to all personnel, regardless of rank, and violations can serve as grounds for disciplinary action.

=== Nepal ===
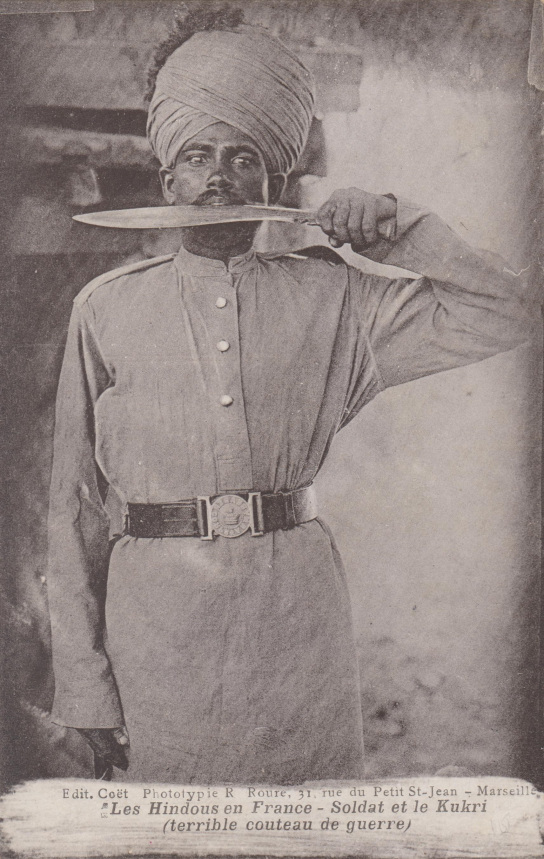
Moustasched Hindu Gorkhali soldier with Khukuri-in-mouth pose photographed in 1915

In the past, moustaches have been popular with Gorkhali Army commanders and soldiers. Military commanders of Kshatriya order (called Kshetri in Nepal), especially of five Kaji noble families – Thapa, Pande, Kunwar, Basnet and Bista – used to link moustaches to dignity.

However, with the changing times, it became apparent that facial hair could break seals on gas masks and thus posed a liability. Currently, moustaches and beards are not permitted within the regulations of the Nepal Army.

=== Singapore ===
Moustaches, but not beards, are permitted in the Singapore Army. If a mustache is kept, it must be kept neatly trimmed and of moderate length. Exception for beards is allowed for those of the Sikh faith.

=== South Korea ===
Beards are not allowed in the South Korean Armed Forces.

=== Sri Lanka ===
The Navy does not allow moustaches alone but does allow full-set beards. Moustaches but not beards are permitted in the Army and Air Force. However, members of the Commando and Special Forces regiments are allowed to wear beards if based outside their home camps.

== Europe ==
=== Austria ===
The Austrian Armed Forces permits moustaches, beards, and sideburns, as long as they are neatly trimmed.

=== Belgium ===
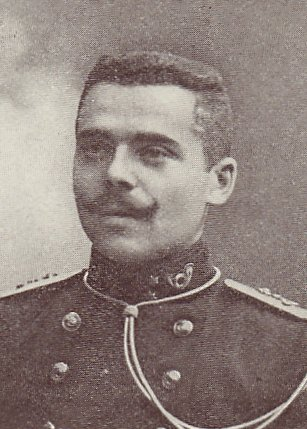
A moustached soldier of the Belgian Army, c. 1900s

The Belgian Armed Forces permits moustaches and beards, but they have to be properly trimmed.

=== Croatia ===
The Armed Forces of Croatia permit moustaches for soldiers and non-commissioned officers. Officers are allowed to wear neatly trimmed beards. Furthermore, beards are not only allowed but fully recommended for members of special operations teams when deployed.

=== Czech Republic ===
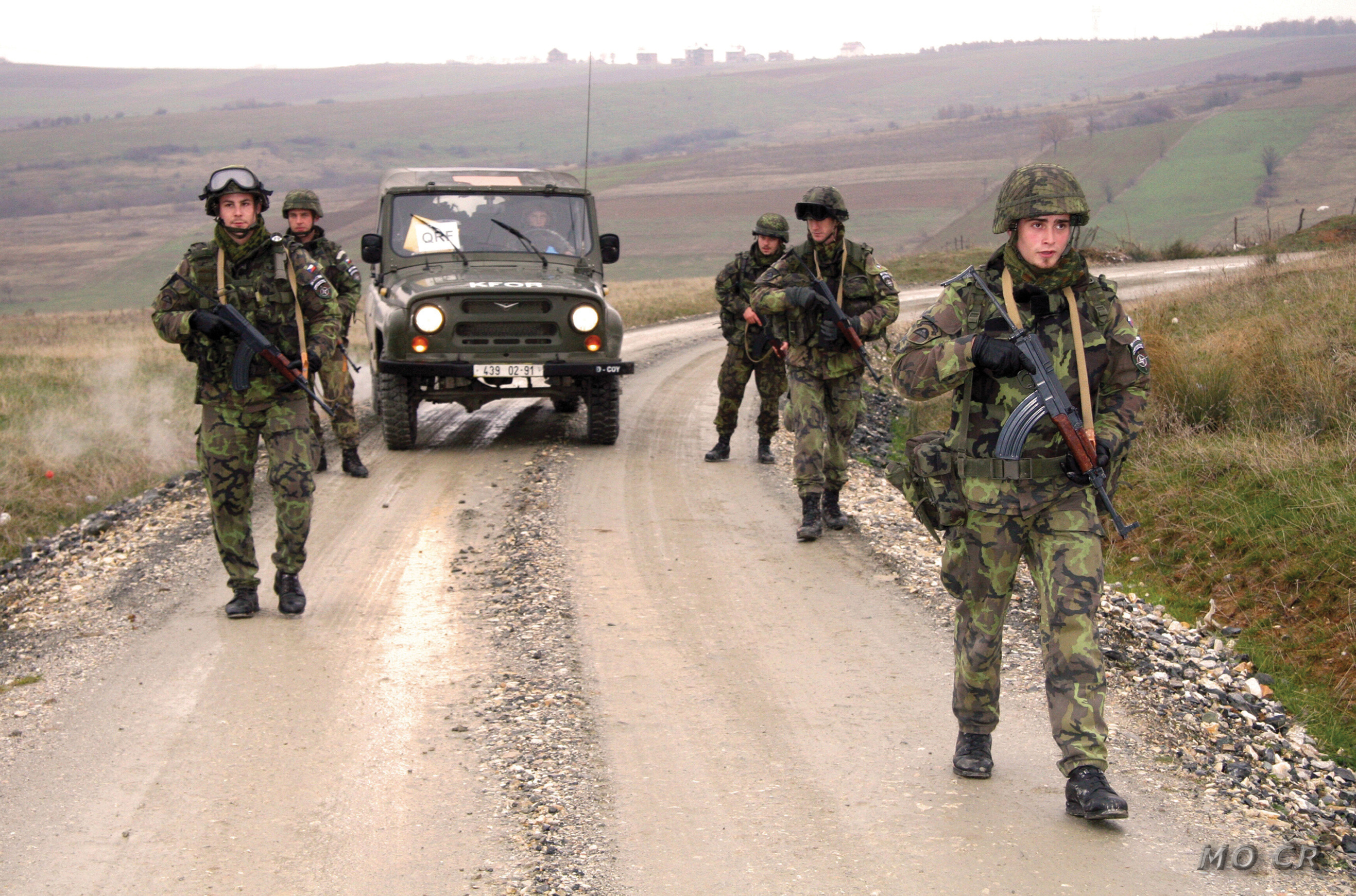
Czech soldiers with various styles of facial hair on patrol in a KFOR operation

The Army of the Czech Republic permits moustaches, sideburns, or a neat full beard of a natural colour. A moustache must be trimmed so that it does not extend beyond the lower margin of the upper lip. Sideburns may not reach under the middle of each auricle. Hairs of sideburns and goatee may not exceed 2 cm (0.787 inch) in length.

=== Denmark ===
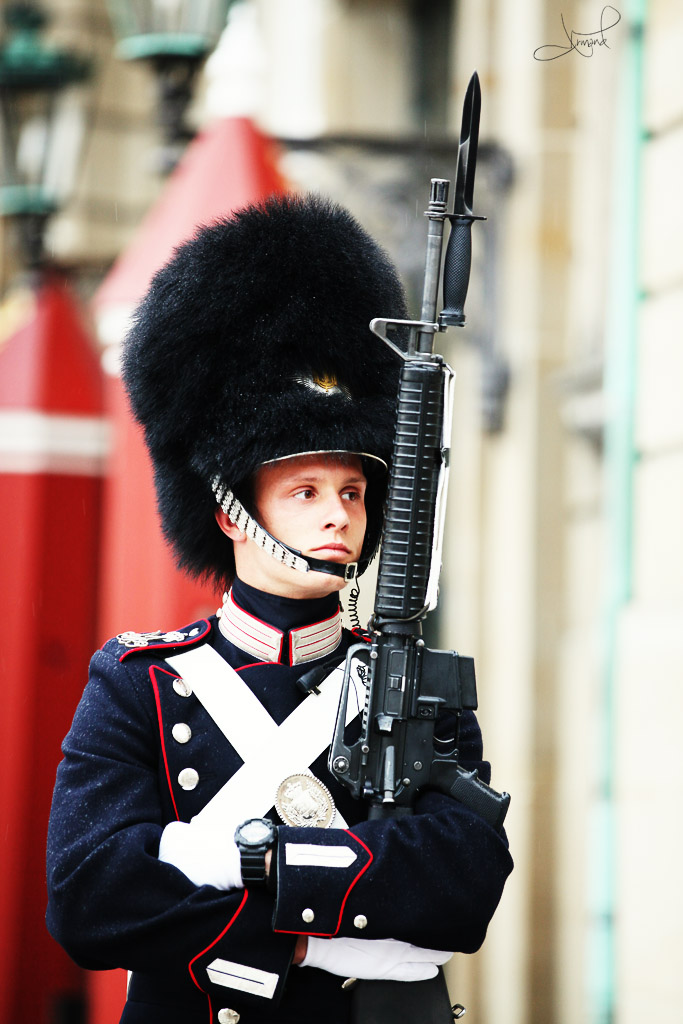
A clean-shaven Danish Royal Life Guard. The unit does not permit its members to wear beards when on public duty.

Danish Army personnel are generally allowed to wear any well-kept beard. However, stubble is not permitted. Full beards were popular among units deployed in Afghanistan, as they are easier to maintain in the field. This also helped break down cultural barriers between the Danish and the Afghans, as most Afghan men wear full beards, and because many Danes grow red-coloured beards, which is seen as a symbol of bravery in Afghanistan.

Soldiers who belong to Den Kongelige Livgarde (The Royal Life Guards) are not allowed to have beards when on guard duty. Additionally, Danish soldiers are not required to have short haircuts, though most have.

=== Estonia ===
The Estonian Defence Forces allow active-duty members to grow facial hair, but it has to be trimmed and groomed properly. As of 2021, conscripts are also allowed to grow facial hair.

=== Finland ===
The regulations of the Finnish Defence Forces (Rule 91) prohibit the growing of facial hair. Reservists can grow facial hair and are not required to shave for short military refresher courses.

=== France ===
Since the Napoleonic era and throughout the 19th century, sappers (combat engineers) of the French Army could wear full beards. Elite troops, such as grenadiers, had to wear large moustaches. Infantry chasseurs were asked to wear moustaches and goatees; and hussars, in addition to their moustache, usually wore two braids in front of each ear, to protect their neck from sword slashes. These traditions were gradually abandoned since the beginning of the 20th century, except for the French Foreign Legion sappers (see below).

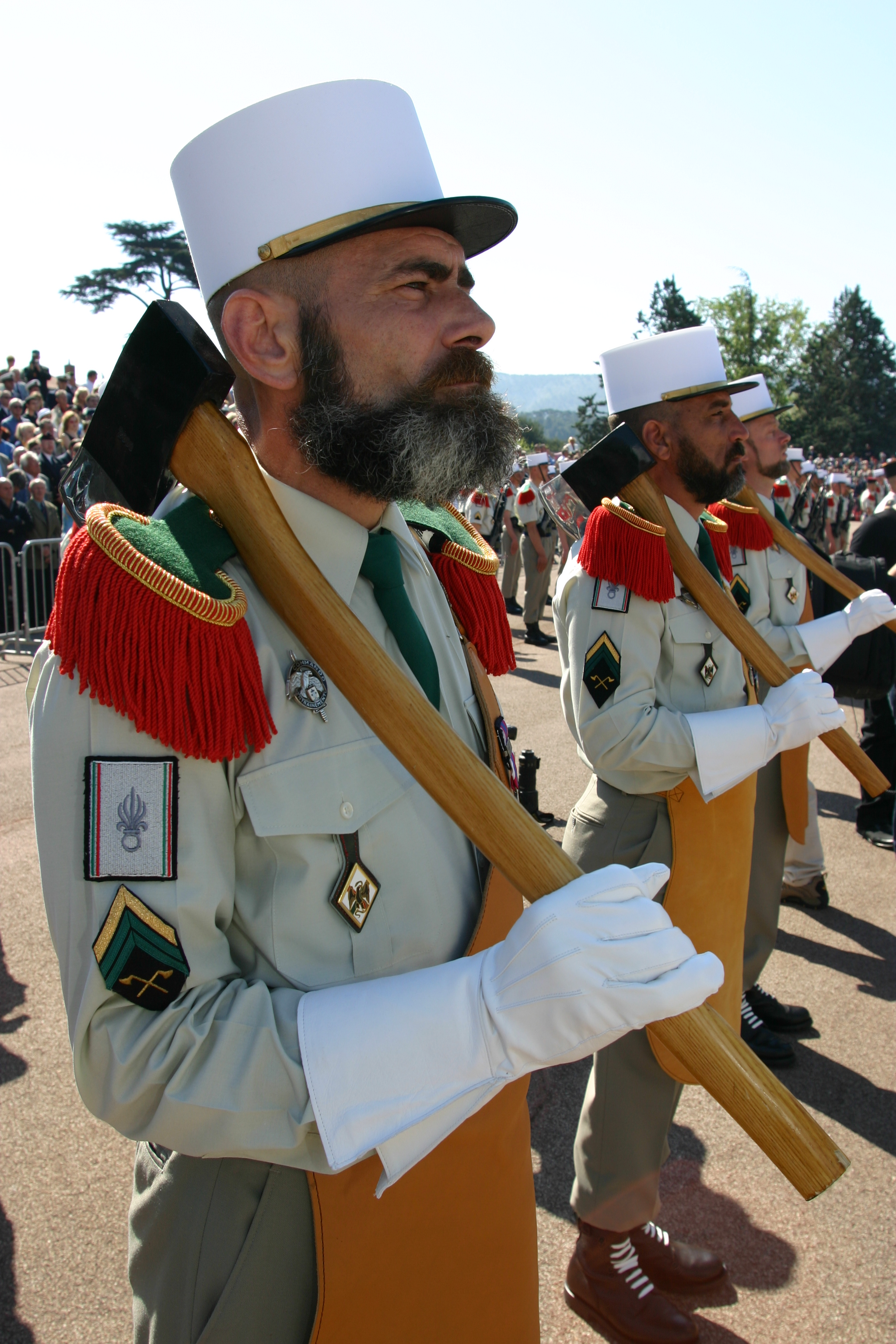
Sappers of the French Foreign Legion traditionally wear large beards

The "decree № 75-675 regarding regulations for general discipline in the Armies of 28 July 1975, modified" regulates facial hair in the French armed forces. Military personnel are allowed to grow a beard or moustache only during periods when they are out of uniform. The beard must be "correctly trimmed", and provisions are stated for a possible ban of beards by the military authorities to ensure compatibility with certain equipment.

However, within the Foreign Legion, sappers are traditionally encouraged to grow a large beard. Sappers chosen to participate in the Bastille Day parade are, in fact, specifically asked to stop shaving so they will have a full beard when they march down the Champs-Élysées.

The moustache was an obligation for gendarmes until 1933, hence their nickname of "les moustaches". By tradition, some gendarmes may still grow a moustache.

Submariners may be bearded, clean-shaven, or "patrol-bearded", growing a beard for the time of a patrol in remembrance of the time of the diesel submarines whose cramped space allowed for rustic and minimal personal care.

French soldiers of the First World War were known by the nickname poilu, meaning "hairy one" in reference to their facial hair.

=== Germany ===
Under Nazi rule, the German military permitted only a small, neatly trimmed moustache, though such regulations were often relaxed under field conditions. The latter was particularly true in the case of the Kriegsmarine and Gebirgsjäger. Growth of a full beard was the norm for U-boat crews on active duty, though facial hair was expected to be shaved off soon after reaching port.

The present-day regulations of the Bundeswehr allow soldiers to grow a beard, provided it is not excessively long, unobtrusive, and must be well-groomed. Beards must not affect the proper use of any military equipment, such as a gas mask. Moreover, stubble may not be shown; thus, a clean-shaven soldier who wants to start growing a beard must do so during his furlough.

=== Greece ===
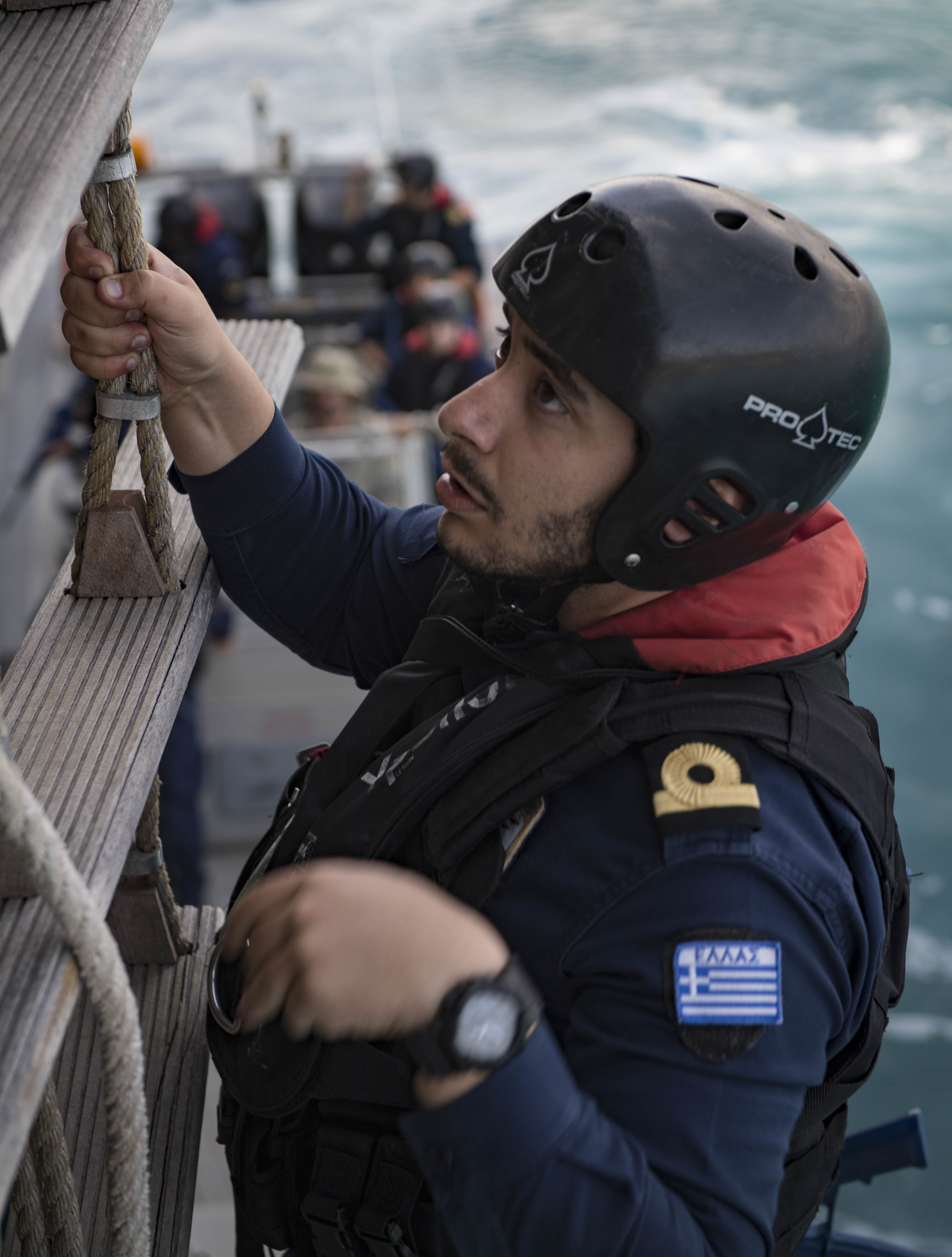
A bearded sailor with the Hellenic Navy boarding a vessel

In the Greek armed forces, only the navy permits military personnel to wear a beard. Neatly trimmed moustaches are the only facial hair permitted in the army and air force. Military chaplains are permitted to wear full beards, as this is mandatory for clergy and monks in the Eastern Orthodox Church.

=== Hungary ===
In the Hungarian Defence Forces (Magyar Honvédség), personnel are permitted to wear facial hair. However, the neck must be shaven, and the maximum length is 1.5 cm. In some cases, unit commanders can prohibit the growing of beards, but not moustaches.

=== Ireland ===
The growing of beards is not permitted in any branch of the Irish Defence Forces except the Army Ranger Wing. Moustaches are permitted with permission. Sideburns are not allowed beyond ear length.

=== Italy ===
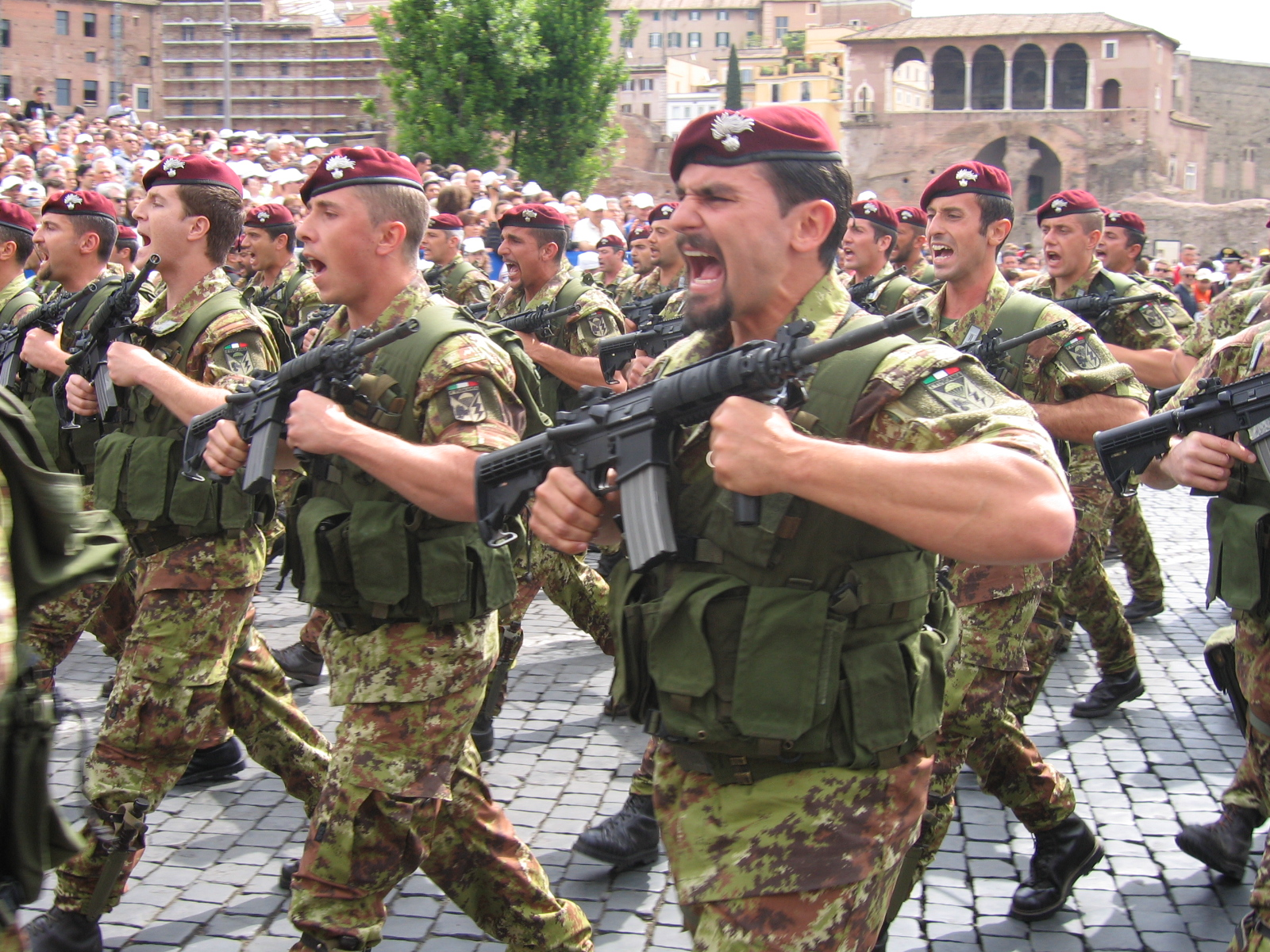
1st Paratroopers Carabinieri Regiment "Tuscania", also from Italy.

In the Italian armed forces, beards or moustaches are allowed if they are well taken care of; without beards, the sideburns should reach the middle of the tragus. Stubble is permitted outside of ceremonial occasions.

=== Netherlands ===
Until 1971, the Royal Netherlands Army had no restrictions on hairdress, as long as that hairdress was short and well maintained. Around 1970, young soldiers, part of 1960s counterculture, began getting into trouble with the army for their long hair. This 'escalated' with the case of Rinus Wehrmann, who in 1971 was sentenced to one year and nine months of jailtime for disobeying officer commands to change his hairstyle. The soldiers union used the case to create a mediahype around the rules resulting in public and political pressure being put on minister of Defense Den Toom who changed the rules on June 16th 1971.

Now, officers and soldiers may grow beards only after permission has been obtained. Automatic permission is given for certain medical conditions. Mustaches may be grown without asking permission. Beards are worn at times by the Royal Netherlands Marines and by Royal Netherlands Navy personnel. All facial hair in the Netherlands armed forces is subject to instant removal when operational circumstances demand it. Recent operations in Afghanistan under the ISAF have seen a trend of growing "tour beards", both for bonding and as a way of advancing contacts with the Afghan population, who regard a full beard as a sign of manhood. A beard without a mustache is uncommon in the Netherlands.

=== Norway ===
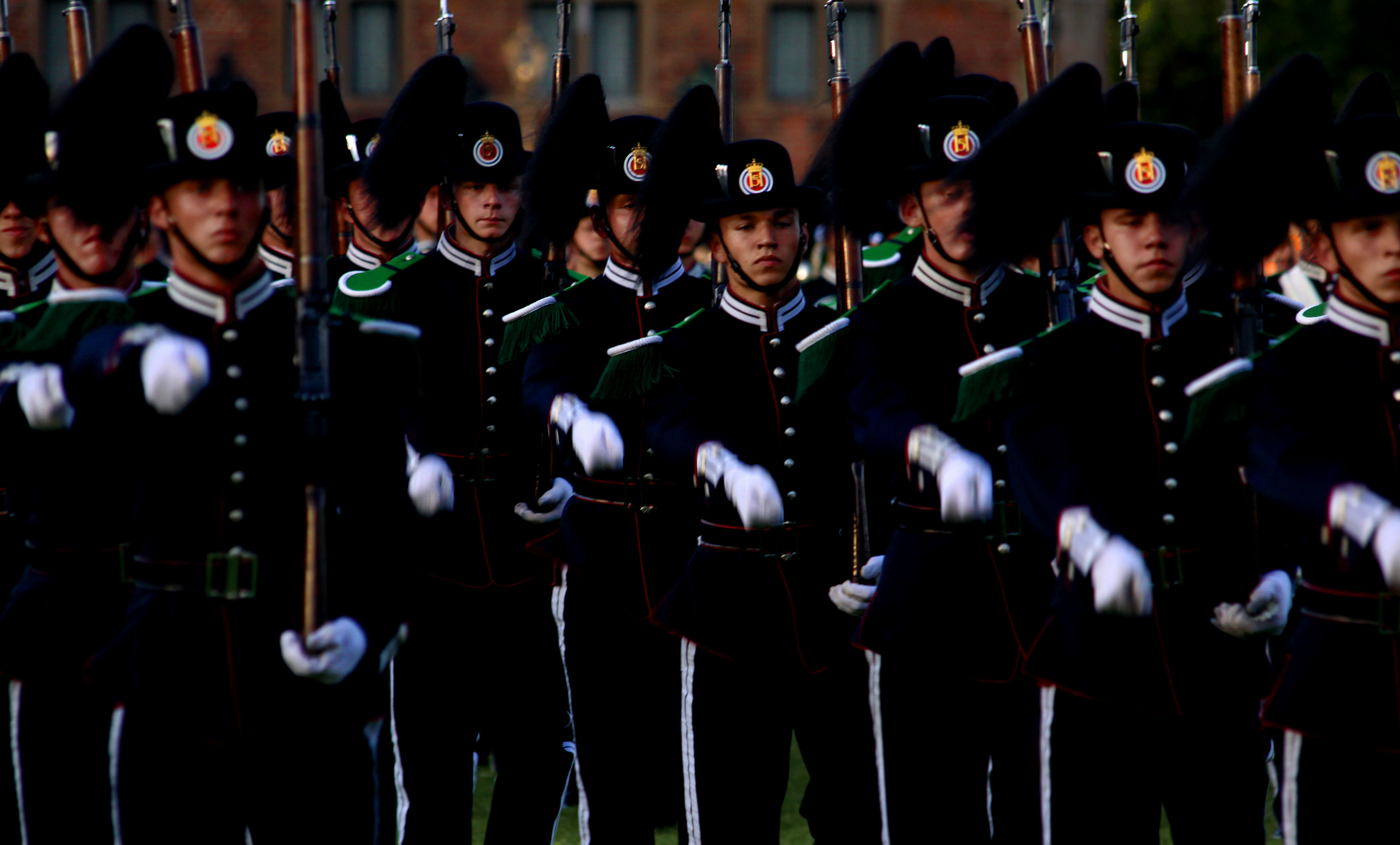
Members of Hans Majestet Kongens Garde. The unit requires its members to be clean-shaven.

The Royal Guard (pictured) is required to be clean-shaven or bearded, depending on the style of facial hair that the monarch wears. Most operative personnel (except musicians and union representatives) are not allowed to wear beards (so as not to interfere with gas masks) unless the soldier obtains written permission to grow his beard from a flag officer; or the soldier already has a beard upon his enlistment and requests to continue growing it or maintain it at its exact length. However, during "out of area" operations (outside the North Atlantic area, like in Afghanistan), soldiers are permitted full beards.

=== Poland ===
According to the General Regulation of the Polish Armed Forces, only neatly trimmed moustaches are allowed without permission. A full beard is allowed only when permitted by a Unit Commander or when based on a written medical statement. However, beards must be neatly trimmed.

=== Portugal ===
Military personnel in the Portuguese Armed Forces can ask permission to grow a beard or moustache. It was quite common, until the First World War, for soldiers to have beards or mustaches. With the resurgence of 21st-century Middle East Military Operations, growing a beard has become more common again, both among Special Forces personnel and regular young soldiers in the Army, Navy, and Air Force. Some Paratroopers use a very distinct moustache.

=== Romania ===
Military personnel must shave their faces regularly to ensure a clean-shaven appearance. Mustaches must be kept short and not extend beyond the corners of the mouth. Beards are generally not permitted without the approval of a commanding officer for specific missions.

=== Russia ===
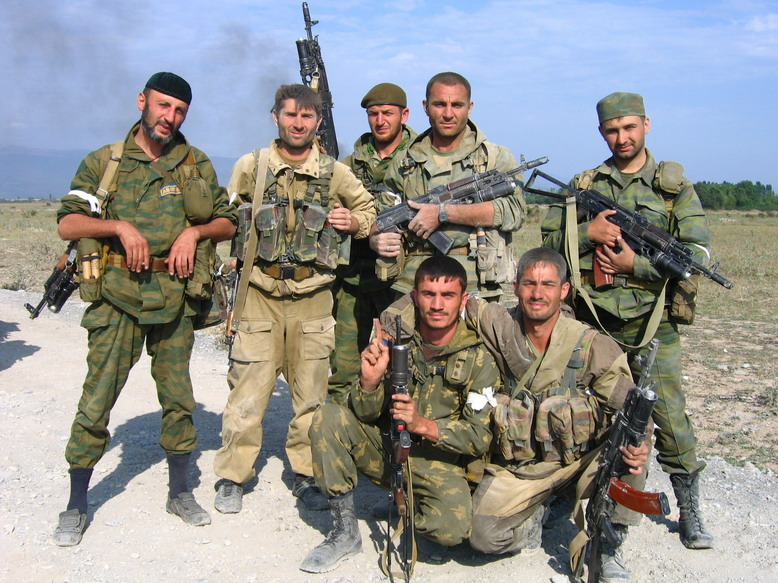
Members of Battalion Vostok during the Russo-Georgian War with varying degrees of facial hair

Traditionally, Russian soldiers of Russian Tsardom wore beards, but during the reign of Peter the Great, they were completely banned in the army and even for civilians, except members of the clergy. Moustaches were also cut. Although the typical image of the imperial Russian soldier shows him with a beard, they were not universally permitted until 1895. Cavalrymen also met these requirements. Officers and staff, on the other hand, grew their hair as they wished and generally adhered to the fashion of the time.

Kadyrovite soldiers and Chechen Volunteers were spotted sporting beards both in Chechnya and in Ukraine.

=== Spain ===
The Spanish Armed Forces permit facial hair, as stipulated in Article 40 of the Royal Ordinances. Dress and grooming standards for Spanish ISAF forces have been relaxed to help the troops blend in better with the local Muslim population.

=== Serbia ===
In the Serbian Armed Forces, neatly trimmed mustaches are the only facial hair permitted. The rest of the face must be clean-shaven on all occasions, except when legitimate reasons prevent it (e.g., winter field operations, war operations). However, soldiers must shave at the first opportunity that the situation permits. Priests of any denomination are allowed to have beards if their religion requires it, but they must still maintain them in a trimmed and well-groomed state.

=== Sweden ===
The regulations require personnel to be "well-shaven" (välrakad). Within the Royal Guard (Högvakten), the royal companies (Livkomp) and other personnel performing ceremonial duties, temporarily or regularly, the regulations are strictly enforced.

Within other units, beards are typically allowed at the discretion of the company commander or another higher-ranking officer. The general provisions of well-managed appearance are also enforced when it comes to beards.

However, in practice, soldiers are allowed to grow beards during service abroad, e.g., in Afghanistan.

The motivation for the regulation prohibiting beards is that it interferes with gas masks by making it difficult to achieve a perfect airtight fit. Shorter beards and the use of gun grease or ointment are one remedy, but they increase the time it takes to put on the gas mask, which in turn puts bearded personnel at an increased risk of exposure.

=== Switzerland ===
The Swiss Armed Forces permit moustaches, beards, and sideburns as long as they are neatly trimmed.

=== Turkey ===
The Turkish Armed Forces require personnel to be clean-shaven at all times.

=== Ukraine ===
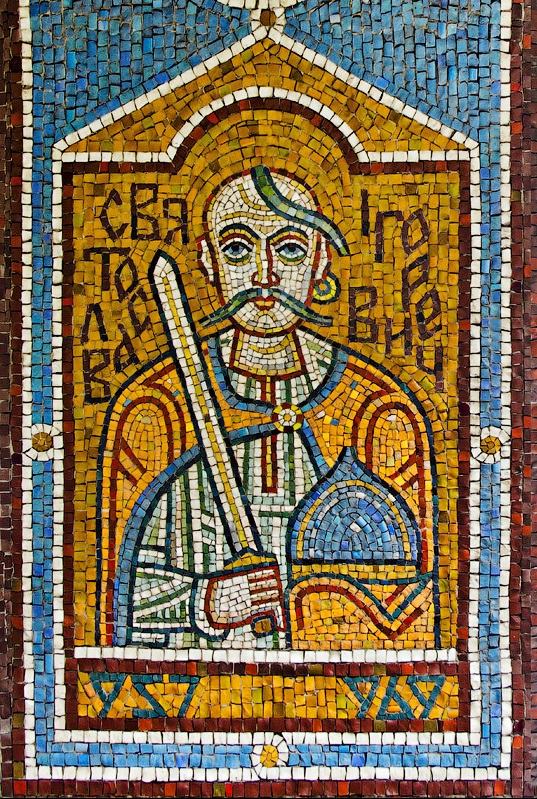
Mosaic of Sviatoslav I, whose distinctive moustache and hair style, the chupryna served as inspiration for later Ukrainian cossacks

Ukrainian Cossacks traditionally have a distinctive facial hair style – the long "cossack" moustache was very popular across Ukraine from the Middle Ages until modern times. The tradition allegedly dates back at least to the time of the prince of Kyevan Rus' Sviatoslav I of Kiev, who was famous for his military campaigns in the east and south. Sviatoslav had a distinctive moustache and hairstyle (oseledets or chupryna) that almost every Ukrainian cossack had centuries after his time (although Svyatoslav had lived in the 10th century, whereas Cossacks appear on the historical scene only in the 15th century).

The length of the cossack moustache was important – the longer the better. Sometimes one had to tuck them away behind one's ears.

Volodymyr Zelenskyy has been seen with a beard during the 2022 Russian invasion of Ukraine.

During the 2022 Russian Invasion of Ukraine, many soldiers and volunteers were spotted sporting beards and various types of facial hair.

Some cossacks wore beards as well, but this type of facial hair was not very popular in Ukraine in general and in Ukraine's military in particular.

=== United Kingdom ===
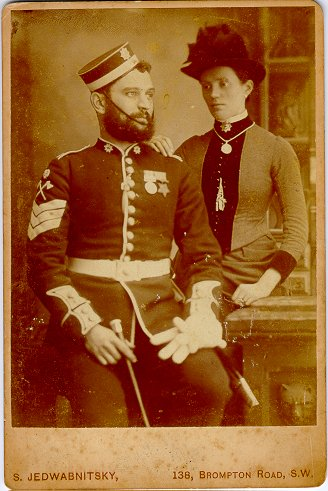
Photograph of a bearded British Army soldier, 1890. By the second half of the 19th century, beards were largely allowed in the British military.

A soldier of Royal Tank Regiment shaving, October 1942

The Royal Navy required all ranks to be clean-shaven until 24 June 1869, when a "full set beard" (i.e. a full beard and moustache) was finally permitted by regulations. This rule has been in force ever since. A beard or moustache may not be worn without the other, and the beard must be full (i.e., cover the whole jawline) and joined to the moustache. The individual must seek permission from his commanding officer to stop shaving and if, after a fortnight without shaving, it becomes clear that the individual cannot grow a proper full set, the commanding officer may order him to shave it off. Unlike the navy, the Royal Marines were permitted to wear moustaches in the army fashion. When the Royal Navy permitted beards in 1869, marines serving afloat were also permitted to wear them, although army regulations remained in force ashore. However, from 8 December 1869, marines were also permitted to wear beards when serving ashore.

Until the mid-19th century, facial hair was unusual in the British Army, except for the infantry pioneers, who traditionally grew beards. A small minority of officers wore moustaches. During the late 1800s, attitudes toward facial hair changed as a result of the Indian and other Asian wars. Many Middle Eastern and Indian cultures associated facial hair with wisdom and power. As a result, facial hair, moustaches, and side whiskers in particular, became increasingly common on British soldiers stationed in Asia. In the mid-19th century, during the Crimean War, all ranks were encouraged to grow large moustaches and full beards during winter.

After the Crimean War, regulations were introduced that forbade serving soldiers of all ranks from shaving above their top lip, essentially making moustaches compulsory for those who could grow them, although beards were later prohibited. This remained in place until 1916, when the regulation was abolished by an Army Order dated 6 October 1916. It was issued by Lieutenant-General Sir Nevil Macready, Adjutant-General to the Forces, who loathed his own moustache and immediately shaved it off. However, there is considerable evidence in photographs and film footage that the earlier regulations were widely ignored and that many British soldiers of all ranks were clean-shaven even before 1916.

After that time, the British Army, Royal Marines, and Royal Air Force generally allowed moustaches only. Exceptions were beards grown for medical reasons, such as temporary skin irritations, or for religious reasons (usually by Sikhs or Muslims). King's Regulations state that, "If a moustache is worn, it is to be trimmed and not below the line of the lower lip", giving rise to the fashion for handlebar moustaches, especially in the RAF where they are still sometimes seen. These were once very common, and the archetypal RAF fighter pilot of World War II wore one. Although also technically against regulations, the "full set moustache" (i.e. a large moustache linked to mutton chop side whiskers, but with a shaved chin) is also still sometimes seen, and the battalion bugle majors of The Rifles, or the other rifle regiments which preceded it, are expected to wear them by regimental tradition.

Infantry pioneer warrant officers, colour sergeants and sergeants traditionally wear and were permitted to wear beards; although not compulsory, most do wear them. In some Scottish and Irish infantry regiments, it was either permitted or expected, by regimental tradition, for the drum major, pipe major, and/or commanding officer's piper to wear a beard. The goat majors in Welsh regiments also traditionally wear beards. Members of the royal family, who are expected to wear military uniforms on ceremonial occasions even long after their formal military service is complete, have sometimes worn beards with Army, RAF or Royal Marines uniform (e.g. King Edward VII, King George V, Prince Michael of Kent and Prince Harry). Beards were also permitted for special forces personnel during covert intelligence operations or behind enemy lines.

On 12 August 2019, the Royal Air Force announced that all personnel would henceforth be permitted to wear beards, and on 28 March 2024, the British Army followed suit. The Royal Marines finally followed suit in permitting beards from early 2025. As with the Royal Navy, all beards worn by members of the armed forces must be a "full set". In June 2025, the Royal Navy permitted moustaches to be worn without beards for the first time.

In the event of conflict in which the use of chemical or biological weapons is likely, service personnel with beards may be required to shave a strip around the seal of the respirator.

== Americas ==
=== Argentina ===
Beards and sideburns have been banned in all military and police forces since the early 20th century. A clean-shaven face is considered a symbol of order, hygiene, and discipline. Stubble is also regarded as unacceptable and controlled with severity. Well-trimmed moustaches are permitted in most of these branches, although in some cases, this is a privilege reserved for officers and sub-officers, and it's not allowed to be grown while on duty.

Before the end of the 20th century, the Navy became a distinct entity within the Argentine Armed Forces, as Adm. Joaquín Stella, then Navy Chief of Staff, permitted beards in 2000 for officers with ranks above Teniente de Corbeta (Ensign), according to Section 1.10.1.1 of the Navy Uniform regulations (R.A-1-001). Adm. Stella gave the example himself by becoming the first bearded Argentine admiral since Adm. Sáenz Valiente in the 1920s. Non-commissioned officers can wear beards from the rank of Suboficial Segundo (Petty Officer) and above. The protocol still requires officers to appear clean-shaven on duty, thus forcing those who choose to sport beards to grow them during their leave. Both full beards and goatees are allowed, as long as they proffer a professional, non-eccentric image. Nowadays, bearded Argentine naval and marine officers and senior NCOs are a relatively common sight.

=== Brazil ===
The Brazilian Army, Brazilian Navy, and Brazilian Air Force permit moustaches, as long as they are trimmed to just above the upper lip. However, only third sergeants and above are permitted to wear mustaches. Beards are generally not allowed except for special exceptions, such as covering a deformity. In such cases, a beard is permitted under authorization.

=== Canada ===
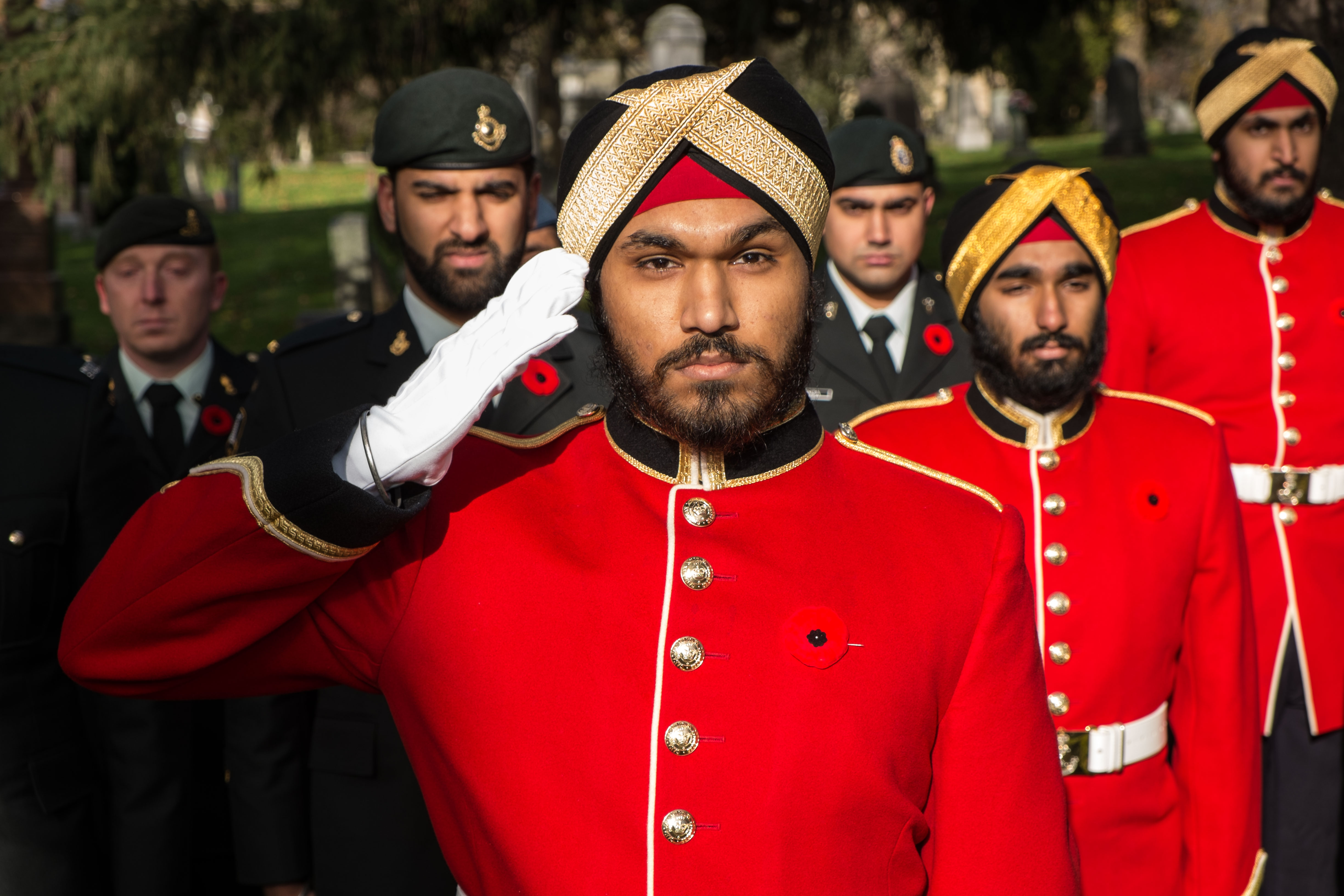
Bearded officer cadets of the Royal Military College of Canada

As of 25 September 2018, the wearing of a beard was authorized for all CAF members upon attainment of their operationally functional point (OFP) or completion of developmental period one, whichever came later. However, commanders, task force commanders, and commanding officers retain the right to order restrictions on the wearing of beards to meet safety and operational requirements. This includes restrictions pertaining to operations and training, where, in a chemical, biological, radiological, nuclear (CBRN) environment or CBRN training environment, a beard can be ordered to be removed to ensure force protection during operations or training. Such restrictions will be as temporary as feasible (e.g., as long as the entire duration of an operational tour in a CBRN environment or as short as a single training day for CBRN operations). Where current CAF equipment capabilities cannot ensure force protection or the effective use of safety systems while wearing a beard, a commanding officer may impose beard restrictions for members using that equipment for operational or safety reasons. In no case was a beard permitted without a moustache, and only full beards could be worn (not goatees, van dykes, etc.) Beards are also allowed to be worn by personnel conducting OPFOR duties.

New regulations that came into effect on 6 September 2022 allow the wearing of sideburns, beards, moustaches, and goatees, or a combination of styles, for all members of the CAF from recruitment to release. There was no maximum or minimum length. However, they must be kept neatly groomed and symmetrical in style while always complying with safety requirements and operational requirements. New regulations came into effect on 2 July 2024, restricting maximum facial hair length to 2.5cm.

=== Chile ===
Beards and sideburns have been banned since the start of the 20th century. However, moustaches are allowed for all permanent personnel of the three branches of the Chilean Armed Forces. According to the 2002 Reglamento de Vestuario y Equipo or Lawbook of Clothing and Equipment, "The use of moustache is allowed for all ranks, having it trimmed just above the lip."

=== Colombia ===
Only after the rank of captain are officers in the Army, Air Force, and Police allowed to wear a well-trimmed moustache that doesn't grow over the upper lip. Beards and sideburns are not allowed. The Navy does not allow facial hair.

=== Mexico ===
Beards and sideburns are not permitted by the Mexican Armed Forces, without exception. Soldiers of any rank must be clean-shaven.

=== United States ===
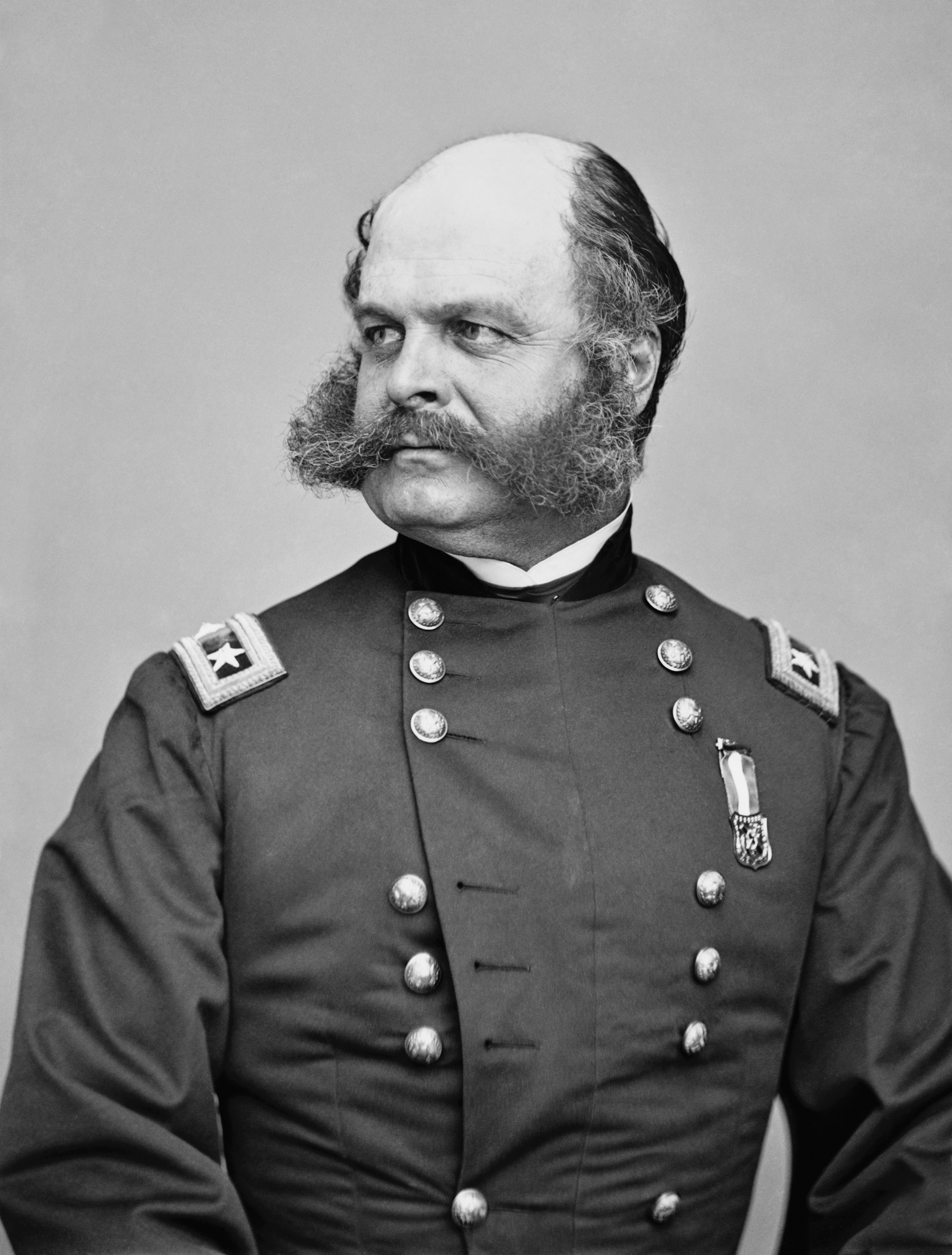
Ambrose Burnside wore a large moustache and sideburns

All branches of the U.S. military currently prohibit beards for the vast majority of recruits, although certain styles of mustaches are still allowed (see below), based on policies that were initiated during the period of World War I.

Excluding limited exemptions for religious accommodation, the United States Army, Air Force, and Marine Corps prohibit beards based on hygiene and the necessity of a good seal for chemical weapon protective masks. The official position is that uniform personal appearance and grooming contribute to discipline and a sense of camaraderie.

On 10 November 1970, Chief of Naval Operations (CNO) Elmo Zumwalt explicitly authorized beards for active duty Naval personnel, in his Z-gram number 57, "Elimination of Demeaning or Abrasive Regulation," although his position was that they were already implicitly allowed based on policy changes made by his predecessor, Thomas H. Moorer:

1. Those demeaning or abrasive regulations generally referred to in the fleet as "Mickey Mouse" or "Chicken" regs have, in my judgment, done almost as much to cause dissatisfaction among our personnel as have extended family separation and low pay scales. I desire to eliminate many of the most abrasive policies, standardize others which are inconsistently enforced, and provide some general guidance which reflects my conviction that if we are to place the importance and responsibility of "the person" in proper perspective in the more efficient Navy we are seeking, the worth and personal dignity of the individual must be forcefully reaffirmed. The policy changes below are effective immediately and will be amplified by more detailed implementing directives to be issued separately.
2. It appears that my predecessor's guidance in May on the subject of haircuts, beards, and sideburns is insufficiently understood and, for this reason, I want to restate what I believed to be explicit: in the case of haircuts, sideburns, and contemporary clothing styles, my view is that we must learn to adapt to changing fashions. I will not countenance the rights or privileges of any officers or enlisted men being abrogated in any way because they choose to grow sideburns or neatly trimmed beards or moustaches or because preferences in neat clothing styles are at variance with the taste of their seniors, nor will I countenance any personnel being in any way penalized during the time they are growing beards, moustaches, or sideburns.

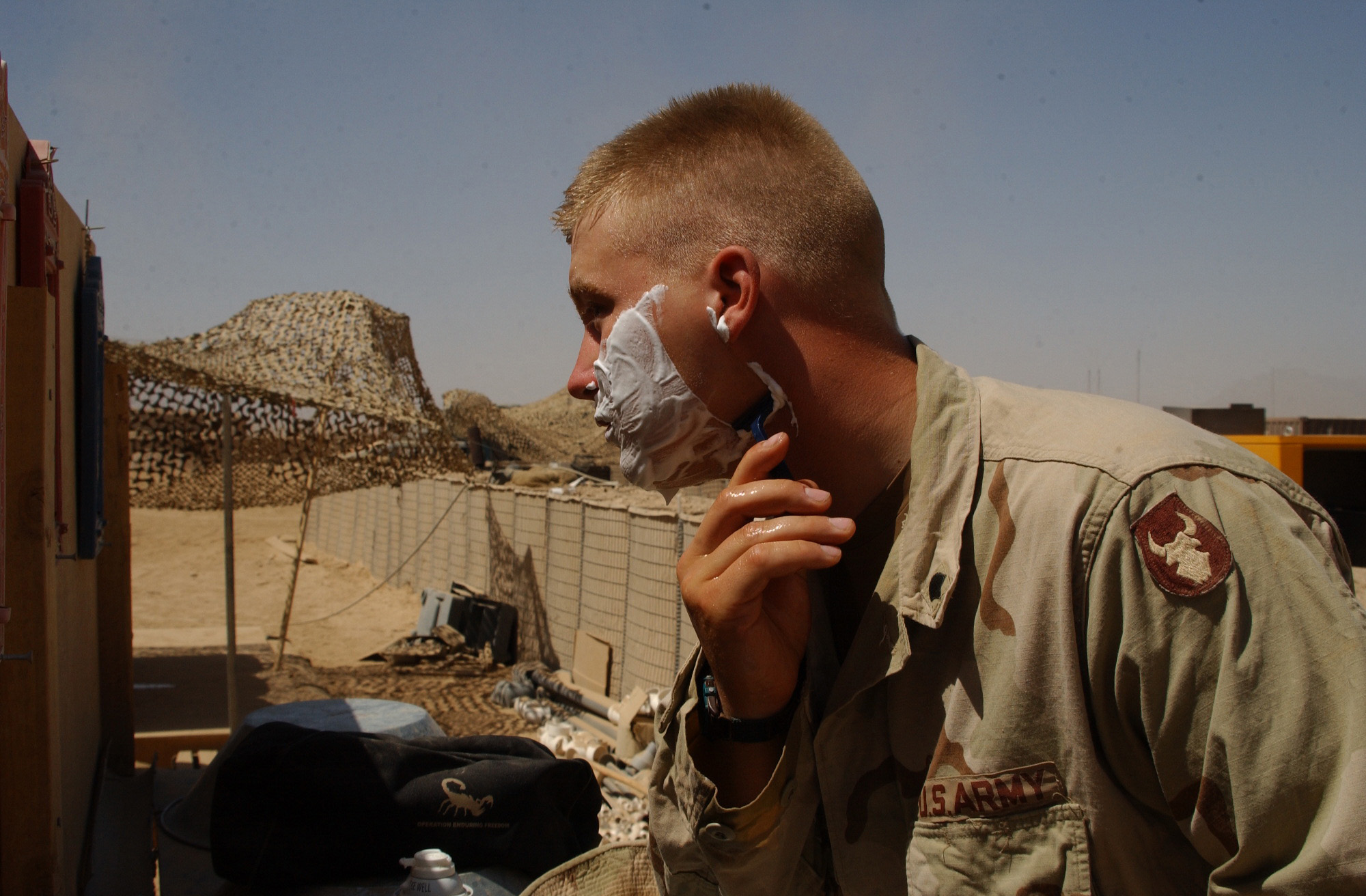
An American soldier shaving his facial hair

The U.S. Coast Guard allowed beards until 1986, when they were banned by Commandant Admiral Paul Yost. The majority of police forces in the United States still ban their officers from wearing beards.

Mustaches are generally allowed in both the military and police forces (except for those undergoing basic training), so long as they are well-groomed. U.S. Army regulations, for example, require that a mustache be "neatly trimmed, tapered, and tidy", and that "no portion of the mustache will cover the upper lip line, extend sideways beyond a vertical line drawn upward from the corners of the mouth...or extend above a parallel line at the lowest portion of the nose."

Those with skin conditions such as pseudofolliculitis barbae or severe acne are allowed to maintain short facial hair with the permission of a doctor or medic. Still, no shaping is allowed; only trimming with an electric razor or an approved regular razor is permitted. 1/8–1/4 of an inch (3.17 mm to 6.34 mm) is usually the standard for this condition. In 2025, the United States Army eliminated long-term medical shaving waivers, stating that soldiers who cannot meet grooming requirements will be disciplined or removed. This disproportionately affects black service members.

==== Exceptions for religious accommodation ====
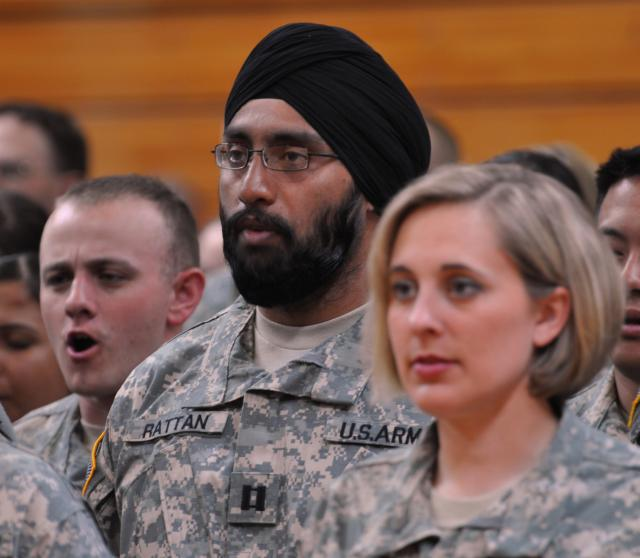
A number of Sikh soldiers in the United States Army have waivers permitting them to wear beards

In 2010, the Army granted waivers for a number of Sikh soldiers and one Muslim soldier, permitting them to have beards (and in the case of the Sikh soldiers, to have "unshorn" hair covered by turbans). In 2010, a rabbi filed suit against the army for permission to be commissioned as a Jewish chaplain without shaving his beard, noting (among other issues) that another Jewish chaplain, Colonel Jacob Goldstein, has been serving (first in the New York State National Guard and later in the United States Army Reserve) since 1977 with a beard. Effective 22 January 2014, the U.S. military expanded its policies on religious accommodation and now allows all officer and enlisted personnel to request permission to wear beards and articles of clothing for religious reasons.

== Oceania ==
=== Australia ===
Beards are typically not allowed in the Australian Army. Moustaches may be worn. However, moustaches may not be grown past the ends of the top lip. Sideburns are not to be grown past the point where the bottom of the ear connects to the facial skin. In some circumstances, such as medical or religious reasons, beards may be permitted. Exceptions to the rule are assault pioneers and special forces that have been deployed.

In the Royal Australian Navy, serving members may grow a beard but only with approval from their commanding officer. The beard must be complete, extending from the sideburns, covering the chin, and joining the mustache. A moustache on its own is not permitted. As of 1 November 2022, serving Royal Australian Air Force members may seek approval to grow a beard from their commanding officer, following the same standards as the Navy; previously, only moustaches were permitted.

== See also ==
Hair-related

- Beard and haircut laws by country
- Beard oil
- Discrimination based on hair texture
- List of facial hairstyles
- List of hairstyles
- Moustache styles
- Pigtail Ordinance

General

- Clothing laws by country
- Dress code
- Emo killings in Iraq
