= Clothing laws by country =

Clothing laws vary considerably around the world. In most countries, there are no laws which prescribe what clothing is required to be worn. However, the community standards of clothing are set indirectly by way of prosecution of those who wear something that is not socially approved. Those people who wear insufficient clothing can be prosecuted in many countries under various offences termed indecent exposure, public indecency, nudity or other descriptions. Generally, these offences do not themselves define what is and what is not acceptable clothing to constitute the offence, and leave it to a judge to determine in each case.

Most clothing laws concern which parts of the body must not be exposed to view; there are exceptions. Some countries have strict clothing laws, such as in some Islamic countries. Other countries are more tolerant of non-conventional attire and are relaxed about nudity. Many countries have different laws and customs for men and women, what may be allowed or perceived often varies by gender.

Separate laws are usually in place to regulate obscenity, which includes certain depictions of people in various states of undress, and child pornography, which may include similar photographs of children.

In some countries, non-sexual toplessness or nudity is legal. However, private or public establishments can establish a dress code which requires visitors to wear prescribed clothing.

There are a variety of laws around the world which affect what people can and cannot wear. For example, some laws require a person in authority to wear the appropriate uniform. For example, a police officer on duty may be required to wear a uniform; and it can be illegal for the general public to wear a police officer's uniform. The same could apply to firefighters and other emergency personnel. In some countries, for example in Australia, the boy scouts uniform is also protected.

In most courts of law, lawyers and judges are required by law or custom to wear court dress, which may entail robes or traditional wigs.

In many countries, regulations require workers to wear protective clothing, such as safety helmets, shoes, vests, etc., as appropriate. The obligation is generally on employers to ensure that their workers wear the appropriate protective clothing. Similarly, health regulations may require those who handle food to wear hair covering, gloves and other clothing.

Governments can also influence standards of dress shown on television through their licensing powers.

In addition to nude beaches and similar exceptional locations, there are some public events in which nudity is tolerated more than usual, such as the naked bike rides held in several countries.

== International laws and customs and culture ==
There are many specific circumstances where body parts have to be covered, often for safety or sanitary reasons.

== Australia ==
In Australia, indecent exposure laws only refer to the genital area. However, many local councils impose their own rules, and have the power to ask topless people to leave an area. Additionally, women who appear topless in public may be charged under broader public order offences, such as causing a public nuisance or engaging in offensive behaviour.

On public beaches, local bylaws are not heavily enforced, and women can often sunbathe topless without issues.

Breastfeeding in public is a legal right in Australia. Under the Sex Discrimination Act 1984, no business or service provider can discriminate against a breastfeeding woman.

== Bhutan ==
Bhutanese law requires all Bhutanese government employees to wear the national dress at work and all citizens to wear the national dress while visiting schools and government offices. Certain colors of sashes are legally reserved for use by royalty or clergy.

== Brazil ==
Ever since 1940, in the Title VI of the Penal Code, naming crimes against sexual dignity (until 2009 crimes against [social] conventions), the fourth chapter is dedicated to a crime named "public outrage [related] to modesty" (Portuguese: ultraje público ao pudor, pronounced [uwˈtɾaʒi ˈpublikwaw puˈdoʁ]).

It is composed of two articles, Art. 233 "Obscene Act", "to practice an obscene act in a public place, or open or exposed to the public", punished with arrest of three months to one year or a fine; and Art. 234 "Obscene Written Piece or Object", to do, import, export, purchase or have in one's property, to ends of trade, distribution or public display, any written, drawn, painted, stamped or object piece of obscenity, punished with arrest of six months to one years or a fine.

It is often used against people who expose their nude bodies in public environments that were not warranted a license to cater to the demographic interested in such practice (the first such place was the Praia do Abricó in Rio de Janeiro, in 1994), even if no sexual action took place, and it may include, for example, a double standard for the chest area of women and men in which only women are penalized. Such a thing took place in the 2012 FEMEN protests in São Paulo.

=== Criticism ===
Pervasive points of criticism to the legislation have included:

- They do not attack anyone's sexual dignity, instead causing outrage at best, but generally just extreme discomfort or embarrassment, that can be easily avoided through not looking to such a scene.
- The Art. 234 is aside obsolete, unconstitutional, for the 1988 post-military dictatorship Constitution having in its Fifth Chapter: "[the people] are free to the expression of intellectual, artistic, scientific and communicative activity, independently of censorship and license", reason to which, instead of making it suffer penal restriction, gives any distribution of media the right to be fully exerted.
- The flourishing Internet culture of Brazil, where such clearly banned media is freely shared in a public place, as well as its pornographic industry and sex shops.

=== Exceptions ===
Brazil has about 35 spaces open or mostly open to the public where it is possible to freely practice nudism, its sole public spaces being 8 beaches. They are not criminalized when the clothes-free area is private and away from a view from the street, or through legislation when the beaches are officiated by a municipal decree, for example. It has hosted the meeting of the International Federation of Naturism in 2008, and there is a growing interest in the practice.

== Canada ==
In Canada, s.173 of the Criminal Code prohibits "indecent acts". There is no statutory definition in the Code of what constitutes an indecent act (other than that the exposure of the genitals for a sexual purpose to anyone under 16 years of age), so the decision of what state of undress is "indecent", and thereby unlawful, is left to judges to decide. Judges have held, for example, that nude sunbathing is not indecent. Also, streaking is similarly not regarded as indecent. Section 174 prohibits being "nude" in a public place or in public view without "a lawful excuse", but defines "nude" only as being "so clad as to offend against public decency or order". The courts have found that nude swimming is not offensive under this definition.

Toplessness is also not an indecent act under s.173. In 1991, Gwen Jacob was arrested for walking in a street in Guelph, Ontario, while topless. She was acquitted in 1996 by the Ontario Court of Appeal on the basis that the act of being topless is not in itself a sexual act or indecent. The case has been referred to in subsequent cases for the proposition that the mere act of public nudity is not sexual or indecent or an offence. Since then, the court ruling has been tested and upheld several times.

A Canadian legal advice web site observes, "Canada has a tangle of confusing and inconsistently-enforced nudity laws. ... The public nudity section is one of the few areas of the Criminal Code that requires the attorney general's consent to lay a charge, implying a certain grey area around what constitutes illegal nudity. According to the government's Public Prosecution Service, the attorney general's consent is needed for two reasons: to avoid the specific harm that could result from prosecuting an innocent person; and to avoid the general harm resulting from prosecuting a case that is not in the public interest. A policy manual from the Nova Scotia Public Prosecution Service enumerates the principles for which they would consider granting consent, which are:

- consent will usually not be granted when the nudity occurs at an isolated or secluded location;
- consent will usually not be granted unless a warning has been given to the alleged offender by police or an authorized enforcement agency, and there is blatant or repeated disregard of such a warning;
- consent will usually be granted in instances of aggressive exhibitionism;
- consent will usually be granted when nudity is accompanied by lewd behaviour or indecent acts involving the alleged offender, or others (assuming that the matter cannot be adequately addressed through prosecution under other provisions).

In 2022 petition e-3999 was circulated to legalize public nudity ("nudism") in Canada. It was determined that the current laws are adequate because "not all acts of public nudity are criminal", thereby leaving the doors open for lawful public nudity. The Attorney General of Canada is concerned about "protecting the public from harmful conduct" rather than public nudity per se. This interpretation of the law means that those who would use nudity to cause a disturbance can still be charged, while those participating in nudity for self-fulfillment purposes may do so without fear of criminal prosecution.

An example of public nudity that is not lawful is the Brian Coldin case, where Mr. Coldin approached people while naked in a park and attended drive-through restaurants while naked. The court found that Mr. Coldin's conduct appeared to lack a connection to the philosophy of naturism, his conduct was confrontational, proselytizing and flamboyant, and did little demonstrate "the pursuit of truth, participation in the community or individual self-fulfillment and human flourishing". Instead, the Court found it was disrespectful and designed to shock and express disdain. The Court found that the method and location of the defendant Coldin's expression was not worthy of protection.

In regards to the Coldin case, the Court stated “naturists find some fulfillment in the conduct of being nude, and, not simply in being nude in private, alone, but being nude in some form of quasi-public place, such as a naturist camp. For them, the conduct of public nudity is imbued with meaning; hence, expressive.” This indicates that the law recognizes 2(b) Charter protections for nude recreation, but only for self fulfilment purposes.

== India ==
In India, people in India have the right to wear any dress they like. The Constitution of India gives their citizens the right to wear anything as a form of personal expression.

However, public nudity with lewd intentions is considered obscene and prohibited. The exact definition of when nudity becomes obscene is ambiguous.

Nudity for religious purposes, such as for Jain Digambaras, is protected under the constitution.

== Iran ==
Following the Islamic Revolution in 1979, Iranian law made the Islamic hijab mandatory for all women in public spaces. In Iran, laws related to the hijab and modesty are enforced across various sectors:

1. Hijab in Public Spaces: Women may wear whatever clothing they choose in public, provided it meets the requirements of the hijab. The hijab is mandatory for all women in public spaces.
2. Modesty in Educational and Work Environments: Schools, universities, and workplaces enforce adherence to Islamic dress codes and behavior in accordance with principles of modesty.
3. Media and Cultural Regulations: Media outlets are required to align with the principles of hijab and modesty in their content.

Additionally, following the dress code is necessary to purchase public transport cards, and signs indicating this requirement are displayed in all public, private, and government service locations.

== New Zealand ==
In New Zealand, there is no specific law prohibiting nudity in public places. If a person is nude and also exhibiting lewd and lascivious, or obscene behaviour, then they may fall foul of obscenity laws.

The Police Offences Act 1908 prescribed imprisonment with hard labor for anyone who "willfully and obscenely exposes his person in any public place or within the view thereof". Male offenders could, at the court's discretion, also be sentenced to be whipped. This was replaced in 1981 by the Summary Offences Act, which abolished the hard labor and whipping and changed the offence to consist of the intentional and obscene exposure of the "genitals" rather than the "person". As well as excusing exposure of the buttocks or female breast from the offence, the change implies – since the words "genitals" and "obscenely" are both specified – that neither one can be automatically taken to imply the other. Public nudity is generally prosecuted under the offensive behaviour or disorderly conduct provisions instead.

The High Court of New Zealand has upheld a conviction of disorderly conduct for nudity in the street, because it was not a place where nudity was known to occur or commonplace. Being nude in the street is likely to incur a small fine if a complaint is made against the person, or if the person ignores a police order to cover themselves. However, in practice, the likelihood of being prosecuted for nudity on a public beach is low, and in the past authorities have declined to prosecute topless and nude people on beaches.

In 1991, a High Court judge quashed a conviction of offensive behaviour for nudity on a beach in the presence of children, on the grounds that, since the beach in question was "a place where it was not uncommon for persons to sunbathe in the nude", a reasonable person would "regard the conduct... as inappropriate, unnecessary, and in bad taste, but not arousing feelings of anger, disgust, or outrage." New Zealand is a common law country, which means that judicial decisions determine the law that subsequent cases must follow.

== Singapore ==
In Singapore, public nudity and nudity in private premises exposed to public view are illegal under section 27A of the Miscellaneous Offences (Public Order and Nuisance) Act.

== South Africa ==
In South Africa specific clothing laws exist for the general public. Nudity is treated under indecent exposure. On 3 April 2015 the country's first official clothing optional beach, Mpenjati Beach near Trafalgar in KwaZulu-Natal, opened after the Hibiscus Coast Local Municipality approved the South African Nudist Association's (SANNA) application. Although nudity has gradually been tolerated on Sandy Bay in Cape Town after the National Party (NP) lost the election in 1994, and strict enforcement of its moral values is no longer applied, it is not an official legally recognised public nude beach. Full or partial nudity may also be tolerated on other beaches or at least turned a blind eye towards.

== United Arab Emirates ==
Since 2008, the municipality of Dubai in the United Arab Emirates has ensured that signs are posted on beaches warning women against topless bathing and indecent exposure contrary to the cultural values of the UAE. There is no fine for breaking this rule, however a warning is issued and if necessary, ejection from the beach. This was said to be in response to residents' complaints about tourists sunbathing topless or nude and changing their clothes in public.

There are also signs at malls and shopping centers that advocate modest clothing which indicates that shoulders and knees must be covered, and public nudity is against the law. Violation of the law leads to a warning to cease and desist at first and would be followed with arrest if the person chooses to disobey the law.

== United Kingdom ==
There are three legal jurisdictions in the United Kingdom (England and Wales, Scotland, and Northern Ireland). There are a further three jurisdictions that are Crown dependencies (Isle of Man, Bailiwick of Guernsey and Bailiwick of Jersey). The details of the law regarding public nudity differ substantially between them. In general nudity is not an explicit offence but there are various offences that may apply to nudity in unsuitable circumstances. What constitutes unsuitable circumstances varies according to the jurisdiction but nudity is legal in a much wider range of circumstances than many people assume.

The Crown Prosecution Service has published guidance for England and Wales; as have the College of Policing.

British Naturism has published guidance for England and Wales, and Scotland. They are preparing guidance for Northern Ireland.

In England and Wales the two statutes most likely to be applicable are s.5 Public Order Act 1986, and for aggressive nudity s.66 Sexual Offences Act 2003.

Stephen Gough, popularly known as the Naked Rambler, has been repeatedly prosecuted for public nudity in the UK.

== United States ==
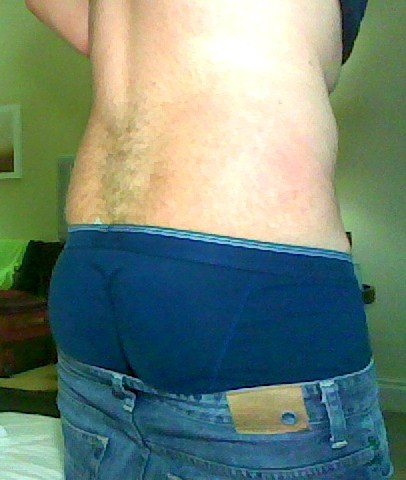
Sagging

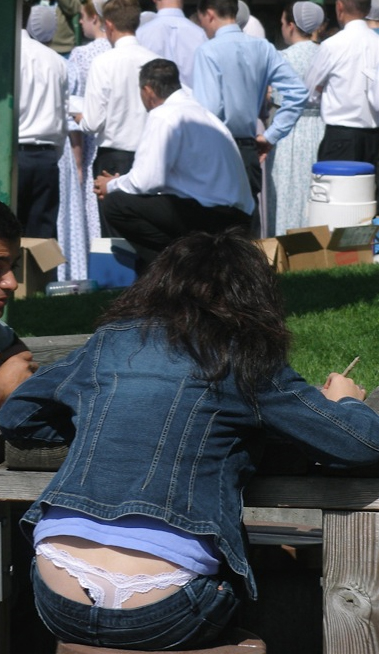
Whale tail

In the United States there are variety of different offenses, such as "indecent exposure", "public lewdness", "public indecency", "disorderly conduct" and so on, which may involve exposure of a specific body part (genitals, buttocks, anus, nipples on women), or a specific intention or effect (being sexually suggestive, offending or annoying observers). In some cases, a member of the opposite sex must be present. In Florida, designated nudity areas are given an explicit exception. There are also some specific prohibitions against sexual acts, such as having sexual intercourse in public, or publicly caressing someone in a sexual way. In Indiana and Tennessee, there are specific prohibitions against showing a noticeably erect penis through clothing, or other sensitive areas through semi-transparent clothing. In some states, indecent conduct can also occur on private property, depending on the intent or effect of the act. In some cases there are exceptions for spouses, breastfeeding, and in New York, theatre performances. In most states, there is a governing state statute which defines the offense; in Maryland and Massachusetts, indecency is defined by case law. Some local (county and municipal) governments also regulate personal exposure, as well as commercial activities such as strip clubs.

Case law in general governs the interpretation of the statutory definition, and in some cases allows for additional exceptions.

In general, exposure of the head, upper chest, and limbs is legal, and considered socially acceptable except among certain religious communities.

Federal, state, and local regulations for certain occupations require various pieces of protective clothing for the safety of the wearer. Such items include hard hats, safety vests, life jackets, aprons, hairnets, and steel-toe boots.

In the first decade of the twenty-first century, there was some controversy in some southern U.S. states over the wearing of trousers so low as to expose the underwear (considered sagging if done by a boy/man. If done by a girl/woman, and if she is wearing thong underwear, it is called a whale tail). The practice was banned in some places.

Some states and towns have loose, or no, regulations for requiring clothing. The city of San Francisco has a history of public nudity, including at public events such as Bay to Breakers. The town of Brattleboro, Vermont, experienced a brief period during which there was public nudity, until a law was passed banning it.

== Summary of various countries ==
A map of countries with a burqa ban. Map current as of 2025. Ban in public places Full or partial ban in some localities Ban on sale and manufacturing Ban in some public buildings or in the public workplace

Europe Burqa Bans. Map current as of 2025. National ban – country bans women from wearing full-face veils in public Local ban – cities or regions ban full-face veils Partial ban – government bans full-face veils in some locations

Country	Attire laws	Maximum penalty
Colombia	Colombian law does not explicitly prohibit public nudity, but it also does not officially permit it. There are no specific legal restrictions against nude sunbathing, yet public nudity is generally not tolerated in most areas. Engaging in nudism outside of designated locations can potentially lead to fines or social disapproval, depending on the local community’s stance.	No info available
Denmark	Public nudity in itself is not illegal in Denmark, however indecent exposure is. Article 232 of the Danish criminal code makes it illegal to violate decency or provide public outrage. This does however not apply to nudity in general. It does apply to public sexual acts or situations where nudity is used to deliberately offend people. As long as people are just nude and otherwise doing nothing offensive they're not breaking the law.	A fine or imprisonment up to 4 years (for indecent exposure)
France	Private parts must be covered except in the areas where it is permitted or tolerated. Naked chests are legal except in the urban zones where there are by-laws or municipal rules. The burqa is banned.	article 222-32: "Publicly visible sexual exhibition in public zones" punishable by 1 year of imprisonment and 15,000 fine.
Germany	There are no explicit legal regulations on clothing in Germany. Nudity on private grounds is considered as legal even if visible from outside. The same applies for naked sunbathing as long as not otherwise stated by local laws. On the other hand, naked jogging or naked cycling have been considered in certain circumstances as public nuisance by several courts. Germany has a long history of allowing mixed sex public nudity in designated areas (e.g., beaches and parks). This was true before WWII, after WWII in both West and East Germany, and currently. Some of these areas are where clothing is optional and some are where clothing is forbidden (i.e., mandatory nudity). In non-designated areas, appearing nude in public "counts as a minor breach of the law. Prosecutions can follow if another citizen is offended, but few ever are." See also: Naturism in Germany and Freikörperkultur	Section 118 of the Act on Regulatory Offences: "(1) Whoever commits a grossly offensive act which is apt to disturb or endanger the public and to prejudice public order shall be deemed to have committed a regulatory offence. (2) The regulatory offence may be sanctioned by a regulatory fine unless the act may be sanctioned pursuant to other provisions." The regulatory fine is between 5 and 1.000 Euros (sec. 17 (2) of the act). More likely, the local or state police may politely demand to cover up without further sanction or a cautionary fine of 5 to 55 Euros if immediately obeyed (sec. 56 (1) of the act).
Netherlands	Nude recreation in the Netherlands has been described in article 430a of the criminal law. The city council can designate public places found suitable for nude recreation. Nude recreation in such places is always allowed. This does however not mean it is forbidden everywhere outside these designated places. It is only disallowed in places accessible to the general public found unsuitable for nude recreation. Whether a place is suitable or not is decided by the judge, not by the government. There have been a number of law cases about this, so jurisprudence is available. In general most places have been found suitable.	A fine of the first category (maximum €410,-).
Saudi Arabia	All visitors to public places shall dress modestly and must not dress in outfits with photos, figures, signs or phrases violating common decency. Men and women are required to dress modestly, refrain from public displays of affection, and avoid using profane language or gestures. Women are required to cover shoulders and knees in public, but they are free to choose a modest choice of clothing.	SAR 3,000 for indecent behavior that includes an act of sexual nature, SAR 6,000 for repeated violations. SAR 100 for wearing improper clothing in public places, SAR 200 for repeated violations. SAR 100 for wearing underwear and sleepwear, SAR 200 for repeated violations. SAR 100 for wearing in public places clothing that bear profane language or obscene images or symbols, SAR 200 for repeated violations. SAR 500 for wearing in public places clothing that bear language, images, or symbols that encourage discrimination or racism, or promote porn or drug use, SAR 1000 for repeated violations.
Spain	Spanish law does not have any national article that prohibits public nudity. However, local laws have been introduced and Barcelona for example has banned nudity or semi-nudity on its streets.	Local fines may apply – in Barcelona from €120 to €500, in Mallorca, Alicante and Malaga up to €700.
Sudan	Females must wear dresses, and socks.	"indecent or immoral dress" punishable by 40 lashes, a fine, or both.
Qatar	Clothes must cover shoulders and be lower than knees. Soles of feet or shoes should not be shown. No public affection. The penal code punishes and forbids the wearing of revealing or indecent clothes, this dressing-code law is enforced by a government body called "Al-Adheed". In 2012, a Qatari NGO organized a campaign of "public decency" after they deemed the government to be too lax in monitoring the wearing of revealing clothes; defining the latter as "not covering shoulders and knees, tight or transparent clothes". The campaign targets foreigners who constitute the majority of Qatar's population.	Unspecified reprimand.
USA	State laws vary, from no proactive ban on nudity, to bans on breastfeeding. Indecent exposure and lewd conduct is illegal and its definition is based on case law.	Someone convicted of felony indecent exposure can be punished with: Incarceration, fines, probation, community service. Sexual offender registry in some states.
Italy		Fine from €5,000 to €30,000, or whoever exposes in a place or nearby a place attended by minors, may be sentenced from 4 months to 4 years and 6 months imprisonment, as per the art. 527 Codice Penale.
Trinidad and Tobago	Camouflage clothing in Trinidad and Tobago can not be worn, nor imported by, civilians.	

== See also ==
- Beard and haircut laws by country
  - Beard tax
- Committee for the Promotion of Virtue and the Prevention of Vice (Saudi Arabia)
- Emo killings in Iraq
- Hijab and burka controversies in Europe
- Hijab by country
- Issues in social nudity
- Jewish hat
- Let's trim our hair in accordance with the socialist lifestyle (North Korea)
- List of places where social nudity is practised
- Muslim patrol incidents in London
- Naturism
- Nude recreation
- Nudity and protest
- Nudity and sexuality
- Nudity
- Right to clothing
- Sumptuary law
- Timeline of social nudity
- Topfreedom
- Trousers § Laws
- Zunnar
- World Naked Bike Ride
