= Anti-Chinese legislation in the United States =

Anti-Chinese legislation in the United States was introduced in the United States that targeted Chinese migrants following the California gold rush and those coming to build the railway, including:

- Anti-Coolie Act of 1862
- Page Act of 1875
- Chinese Exclusion Act of 1882
- Pigtail Ordinance

== See also ==
- Burlingame Treaty
- Chinese Exclusion Act – (United States)
- China exclusion policy of NASA, 2011 – (United States)
- Chinese Immigration Act of 1885 – (Canada)
- Chinese Immigration Act, 1923 – (Canada)
- Definitions of whiteness in the United States
- Eugenics in the United States
- Geary Act
- Immigration and Nationality Services Act of 1965
- Magnuson Act
