= Sanitary Ordinance =

1870 San Francisco law regulating tenements

The Sanitary Ordinance, also known as the Cubic Air Ordinance, was a law passed in San Francisco, California on July 29, 1870. The ostensible purpose of the law was to prevent unsafe tenement conditions as the city grew. Under the law, boarding houses were required to have 500 cubic feet (14,000 L) of air in a room for each occupant. The penalty for violating the ordinance was a fine of $10–$500, 5–90 days in jail, or both, imposed on both the landlord and the occupants.

Realizing this amounted to free room and board, many Chinese immigrants intentionally violated the conditions. After a housing raid on May 22, 1873, 45 people were arrested in a single day and the small local jails were filled to capacity. It was reported that some of those arrested were willing to pay the fine, but were ordered by leaders in Chinatown to accept jail time instead; the intent was to make the enforcement of the law more trouble than it was worth. Local Chinese leaders also noted that local authorities were breaking their own law since the small jails were filled to capacity, thereby violating the ordinance. This situation led to the Board of Supervisors' proposal of the Pigtail Ordinance.
