= Let's trim our hair in accordance with the socialist lifestyle =

North Korean government propaganda campaign

Let's trim our hair in accordance with the socialist lifestyle (Korean: 사회주의적생활양식에 맞게 머리단장을 하자; alternatively translated as Let us trim our hair in accordance with Socialist lifestyle) was a television program broadcast on state-run Korean Central Television in North Korea between 2004 and 2005 as part of a longstanding government propaganda against haircuts and fashions deemed at odds with "socialist values". The program claimed that long hair could adversely affect hygiene and human intelligence, as growing it "consumed nutrition" which would ultimately starve the brain of energy and reduce human intelligence.

== North Korea's fashion restrictions ==
Such dress and hair standards have long been a fixture of North Korean society. Kim Jong Il was known for his "Speed Battle Cut" crew cut when he first came to prominence in the early 1980s, though he later reverted to the short sided bouffant favored by his father. After Kim Jong Il succeeded his father, some of the state's restrictions on Western fashion were relaxed. Women were allowed permanent waves, men could grow slightly longer hair, and public dancing was allowed. Despite such slight concessions during the early years of Kim Jong Il's rule, obvious emblems of Western fashion such as jeans are occasionally banned, and long hair on men could lead to arrest and forced haircuts.

According to the North Korean daily Rodong Sinmun (Worker's Newspaper), the leadership was fighting a guerrilla war against the possible incursion of capitalism into the sphere of personal appearance. Along with long hair, untidy shoes were identified as the epitome of Western culture which, by imitation, would lead the country to ruin.

== Television series ==
Image from the Let's trim our hair in accordance with the socialist lifestyle television broadcast, showing two acceptable haircuts, modeled by factory workers in the DPRK

The series began in 2004 as part of the regular television program Common Sense. In the autumn of that year, a larger media campaign (print and radio as well as television) began promoting proper attire and neat appearances for men. The show encouraged short hairstyles, such as the flat-top crew cut, middle hairstyle, low hairstyle, and high hairstyle. It said that hair should be kept between 1 and 5 cm (0.4 and 2.0 in) in length, and recommended haircuts for men every 15 days. The country's official hairstyles did allow men over 50 years old to grow their upper hair up to 7 cm (2.8 in) long, to disguise balding.

An initial five-part series of the show featured officially endorsed haircut styles, while a later series went a step further by showing certain men as examples of how not to trim one's hair. With each example, the show conveyed the person's name and where they lived (or worked) via subtitles and/or voice. For example, in one episode (shown in January 2005) a North Korean citizen named Mr. Ko Gwang-hyun, whose unkempt hair covered his ears, was shown as a negative role model, with the voiceover commentary: "We cannot help questioning the cultural taste of this comrade, who is incapable of feeling ashamed of his hair style. Can we expect a man with this disheveled mind-set to perform his duty well?"

In the North Korean capital city of Pyongyang, hidden cameras were placed to catch citizens with improper hairstyles. This was part of a television programme broadcast at the same time as Let's Trim Our Hair in Accordance with the Socialist Lifestyle. The offenders would then be interviewed by the presenter and asked to explain themselves. Their name, address and workplace would be announced to embarrass them in the hopes that fear of such social ostracism would influence others' behavior.

== See also ==
- Propaganda in North Korea
- Beard and haircut laws by country
