= Beard oil =

Cosmetic product

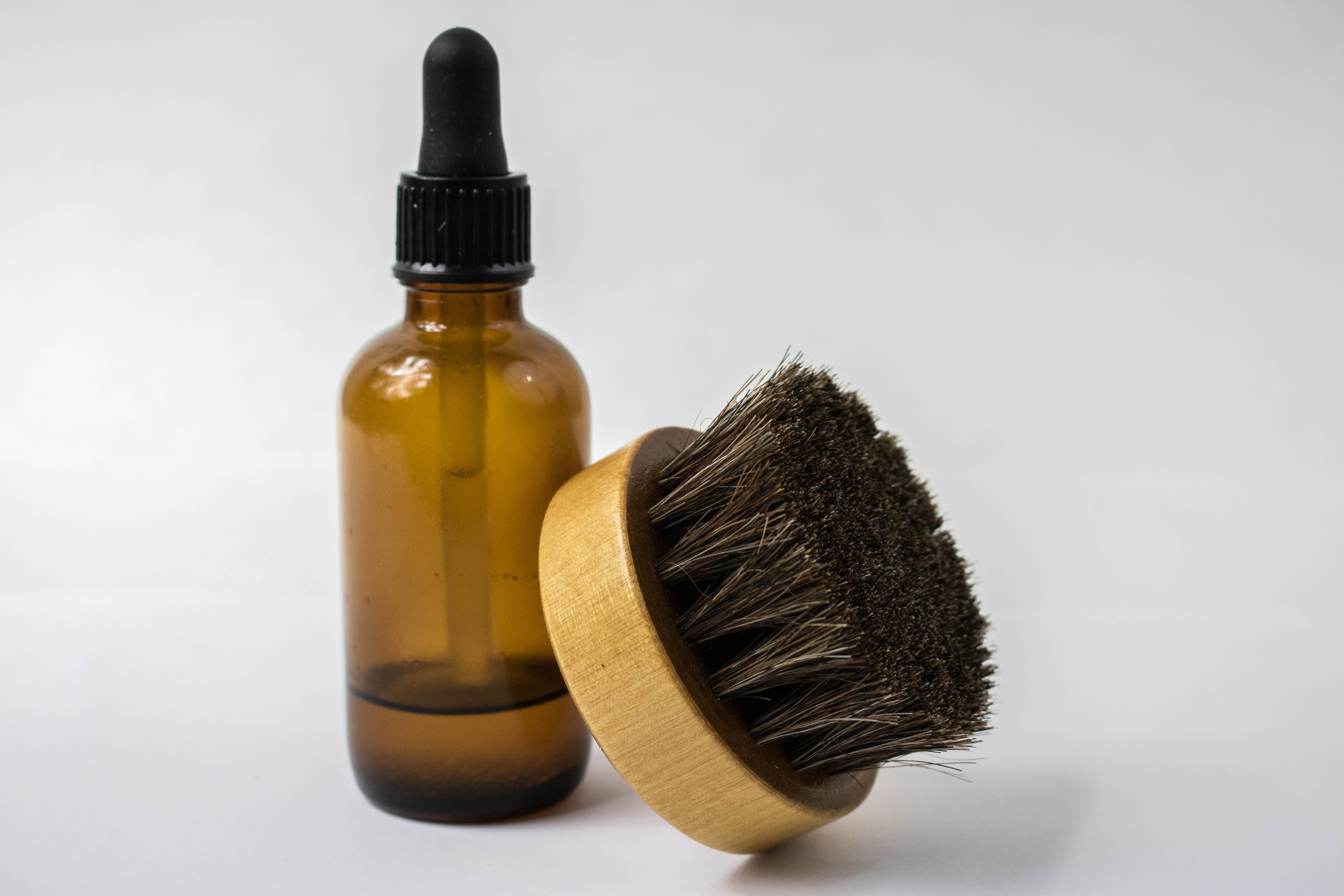
A bottle of beard oil and a brush

Beard oil is a cosmetic product that is used to nourish both the skin under the beard and the beard itself in order to keep it "soft, shiny, and smooth". Beard oil mimics the natural oils produced by skin, such as sebum, and is composed mainly of carrier oils and essential oils.

== Ingredients ==
Beard oil products are a blend of various ingredients, such as jojoba oil, argan oil, coconut oil, grape seed oil, hempseed oil, ostrich oil, and castor oil that are used to address specific beard problems such as itching, sensitive skin or dryness by going straight to the follicle in a similar fashion to hair conditioner.

Beard oil is usually scented, though unscented versions are available. A variety of natural and artificial events, typically masculine, scents ranging from sweet to bitter and can be used to substitute cologne or aftershave.

== Benefits ==
Beard oil acts as a moisturizer that goes straight to the hair follicle and restricts hair from growing brittle, especially in cold, windy environments as these weather conditions cause the natural moisture of the beard area to wick. Hydration around this area helps prevent flaking, dandruff and skin dryness. Some brands of beard oil may contain added vitamins or nutrients such as tocotrienols, or more commonly known, vitamin E. This moisturization prevents general itchiness and irritation of the skin under the beard.

Beard oil also works below the surface of the skin by working as a grooming tool, making the beard itself more manageable, neat and smooth.

Beard oil also improves the way a beard looks by giving it a slight shine. This makes a beard look healthier as well.

== Chemical makeup and formulations ==
Beard oils are manufactured with the intent to emulate the natural oils produced by the skin, known as sebum. Carrier type oils generally contain vitamins A, D and E, as well as a high concentration of linoleic acids and low concentrations of oleic acids. Natural and synthetic scents may be added to the oil in order to enhance its properties and aroma. Natural scents (essential oils, absolutes, and extracts) are derived differently than synthetic scents and contain different chemical compounds that enhance their functionality. This can give beard oils properties such as antibacterial, deodorant, anti-inflammatory and anti-aging. Beard oils sold in the United States making claims to be therapeutic must be approved by the FDA.

Natural beard oils are typically created with both carrier oils and essential oils, absolutes, and/or extracts. Carrier oils are oils that make up the bulk of the volume of the product and are formulated to condition the skin and beard. The most popular types of carrier oils are coconut, grape seed, jojoba, saffron and argan. Essential oils are used as a natural fragrance for the beard oils, but may also have aromatherapy benefits. Since essential oils, absolutes, and extracts are often strong enough to cause chemical burns or skin irritation on their own, they are typically paired up with carrier oils in order to dilute them.

== Popularity ==
Awareness of beard oil and beard-grooming products has been increasing due to the fact that industries have become "more permissive" of facial hair.

== See also ==
- Beard and haircut laws by country
- List of facial hairstyles
- List of hairstyles
- Moustache styles
