= Pigtail Ordinance =

1870s law in San Francisco and California

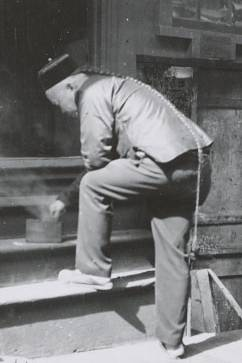
Chinese American man with queue in San Francisco's Chinatown

The Pigtail Ordinance was an 1873 law intended to force prisoners in San Francisco, California to have their hair cut within an inch of the scalp. It affected Qing Chinese prisoners in particular, as it meant they would have their queue, a waist-long, braided pigtail, cut off. The proposal passed by a narrow margin through the San Francisco Board of Supervisors in 1873 but was vetoed by the mayor. An identical version of the law was enacted by the California State Legislature in 1876 and was subsequently struck down as unconstitutional in 1879.

== Origins ==
The Pigtail Ordinance was proposed as a solution to the overcrowding of jails due to the 1870 Sanitary Ordinance, which was originally meant to prevent unsafe tenement conditions in San Francisco. When in violation of the Sanitary Ordinance, one could either pay a fine or serve a week or more in jail; for thousands of impoverished Chinese immigrants, free room and board was a welcome punishment. Ostensibly to prevent outbreaks of lice and fleas, the Supervisors began requiring that all prisoners' heads be shaved. Many equal rights advocates, however, claimed the Supervisors' true intent was to stem the tide of willing Chinese convicts.

Since the beginning of the Qing dynasty in 1644, Han men in China had been required to adopt Manchu men's hairstyle by wearing the queue and shaving the forehead as a symbol of accepting the Qing dynasty. Han Chinese did not object to wearing the queue braid on the back of the head, as they traditionally wore their hair long. However, they fiercely objected to shaving the forehead. This caused the Qing government to focus on forcing people to shave their forehead rather than wear the braid.

Han rebels who objected to the Qing hairstyle wore the braid but defied orders to shave the front of the head. One person was executed for refusing to shave, even though he had willingly braided the back of his hair. It was only later that Westernized revolutionaries, influenced by European hairstyles, began to advocate against the queue. During the Taiping Rebellion, the Taiping protested against the Qing by retaining their queues but not shaving the rest of their heads. The traditional style of queue with shaved head became a sign of loyalty to the Qing.

The late 19th century saw a significant increase in Chinese immigration to the United States. By 1880, the Chinese population of the United States was over 100,000 and located primarily in California. Over 90% of immigrants were male and had come to the United States to earn money to send to their families. As the majority of these men planned to return to China, they needed to keep their queues lest they be marked as revolutionaries. In light of this, the idea behind the institution of the Pigtail Ordinance was that Chinese immigrants would be less likely to ignore the city's sanitary ordinance. Anti-Chinese sentiment also was a driving factor, hoping that the enforcement of the Pigtail Ordinance would keep potential Chinese immigrants from coming to the United States.

== Veto and passage ==
After approval by the Board of Supervisors, the order was immediately vetoed by San Francisco mayor William Alvord. In his veto, the mayor stated that "this order, though general in its terms, in substance and effect, is a special and degrading punishment inflicted upon the Chinese residents for slight offenses and solely by reason of their alienage and race."

On April 3, 1876, the California State Legislature enacted their own law to Los Angeles's Sanitary Ordinance. The city no longer had the power to ignore the enforcement of the law, so the board made a second proposal of the Pigtail Ordinance. This time the law passed with a vote of 10–2, and was approved by mayor Andrew Jackson Bryant.

== Lawsuit ==
As a result of the new law, a Chinese immigrant named Ah Kow was arrested for living space violations and had his queue removed at the jail. He sued the sheriff for damages, claiming that the Pigtail Ordinance caused him irreparable harm. On June 14, 1879, United States Supreme Court Justice Stephen Johnson Field, sitting in the local federal court—despite much criticism from the general public—found in favor of the plaintiff; his decision held that it was not within the powers of the Board of Supervisors to set such a discriminatory law and that the ordinance was unconstitutional. In particular, he cited the Fourteenth Amendment to the United States Constitution which guarantees equal protection under the law to all persons within its jurisdiction. See Ho Ah Kow v. Nunan, 12 Fed. Cas. 252 (1879).

== See also ==
- Anti-Chinese legislation in the United States
- Beard and haircut laws by country
- Chinese Americans
- California Gold Rush
