= Beard and haircut laws by country =

Secular laws regulating hairstyles exist in various countries and institutions.

== Present laws ==
=== India ===
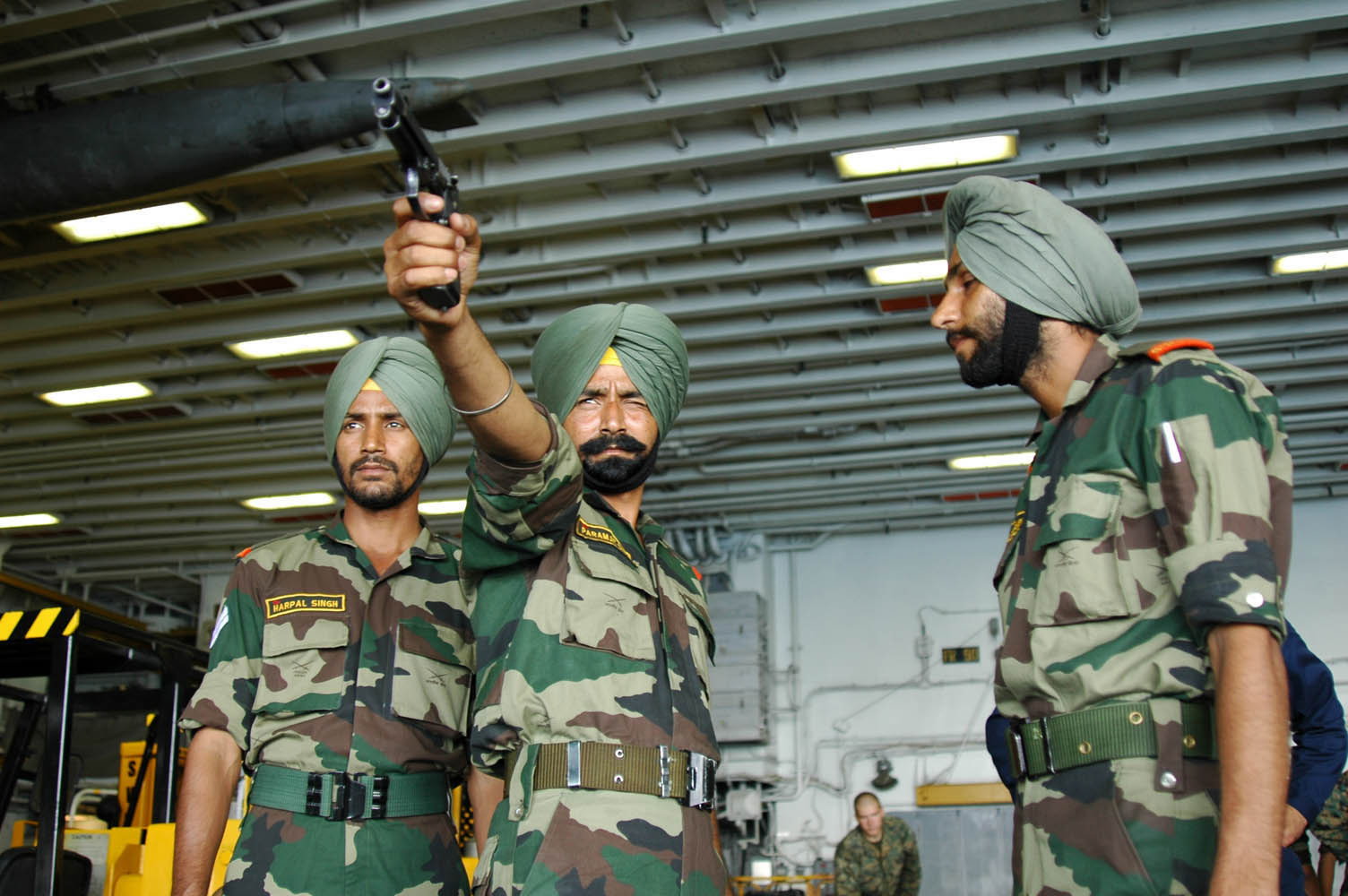
Out of respect for their religion, Sikhs are allowed to grow beards in the Indian army.

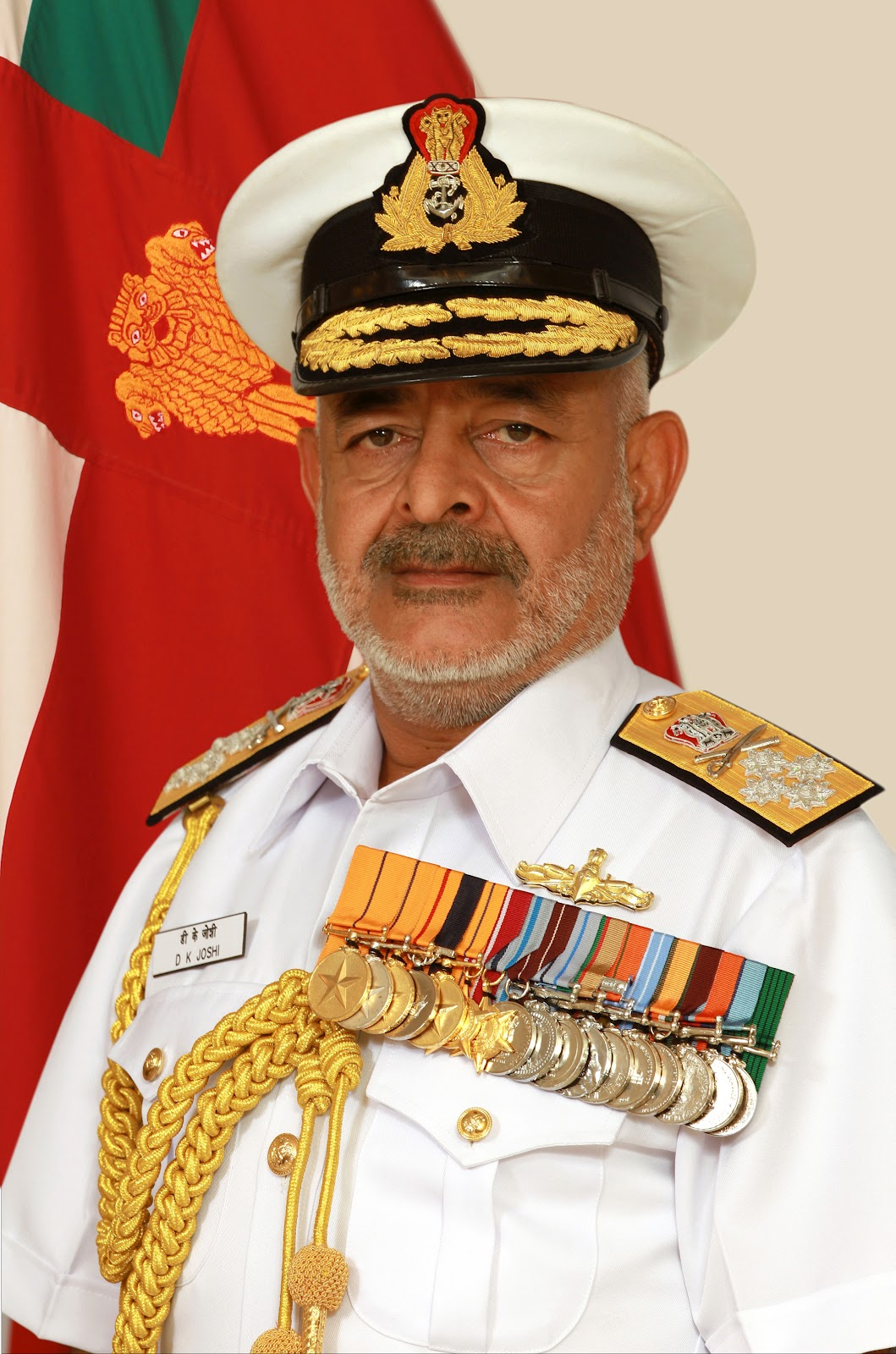
Admiral D. K. Joshi of the Indian Navy with designer stubble.

In the armed, paramilitary and law enforcement forces of India, male Sikh servicemen are allowed to grow full beards as their religion expressly requires followers to do so. However, they are specifically required to "dress up their hair and beard properly". In December 2003, the Supreme Court of India ruled that Muslims in uniform can grow beards.

Non-Muslims and non-Sikhs serving in the Indian Army or the Indian Air Force are not permitted to grow beards. However, Army personnel on active duty are sometimes exempt from facial hair regulations for the duration of their tour of duty if their deployment makes it difficult to shave. Indian Navy personnel are allowed to grow beards with the permission of their commanding officer. Exceptions for other religions are made in the case of special forces operatives like the Indian Air Force pilots, the Indian army's Para (Special Forces) soldiers, and the navy's MARCOS commandos, who are allowed to grow beards. Non-Sikh personnel are allowed to grow whiskers and moustaches, with the only regulation being that they "will be of moderate length".

=== Iran ===
Women are required to wear the hijab by Iranian law, but there are no specific laws governing men's hairstyles in public, except in certain institutions like schools, the military, and for government employees, where particular hairstyles are not permitted. Additionally, according to the Head of the Tehran Men's Barbershop Union, some hairstyles for men, including those associated with Satanism, as well as ponytails, mullets, and spikes, have been banned in barbershops. In 2007, the authorities closed barbershops that did not comply with the rules.

=== North Korea ===
Radio Free Asia reported in 2014 that the North Korean government had a recommended list of 18 hair styles for women and 10 hair styles for men; further, some colleges had recommended male students model their hair after Kim Jong-un. However, Dr. Katharine H. S. Moon, Wasserman Chair of Asian Studies at Wellesley College, refutes these claims, stating that, "There's no evidence that their hairstyles must follow totalitarian regulation," and that she had personally witnessed a wide variety of hair styles, including hair dye, while visiting Pyongyang in 2013.

=== Tajikistan ===
Beards are discouraged by the government for most men in Tajikistan in a stated effort to battle radicalism. Only clean-shaven men can apply for a passport. Beards are often forcibly shaved off by police officers.

=== Turkmenistan ===
In modern Turkmenistan, since the late 1990s, a total ban on the wearing of beards has been unofficially imposed on all segments of the population, with the exception of the elderly over the age of 65 (in Turkmenistan they are called "yashuli") and Russian Orthodox and Armenian Church clerics and priests. Even Muslim imams and clerics under the age of 65 are prohibited from wearing even three days of stubble. Muslim men with beards longer than two weeks of stubble can be forcibly shaved off by the Police and added to the list of violators. In modern Turkmenistan, beards are associated with Islamic fundamentalism, so beard owners automatically become suspects among the Police and Special Services. Only mustaches are allowed. Unofficial beard bans in Turkmenistan are the most severe in Central Asia.

=== Thailand ===
Male Thai police and military personnel, as of 2017, are required to keep a hairstyle known as the "904 cut". The style means shaving the sides and back of the head, leaving just a suggestion of hair on top. The corresponding hairstyle for female police officers and female soldiers, in case of long hair (shoulder level), must keep their hair in a bun with the proper color of ribbon and net (black, dark brown or navy blue).

School dress codes in Thailand have long mandated earlobe-length bobs for girls and army-style crew cuts for boys. It is not uncommon for teachers to cut the hair of students deemed to be in violation of the frequently arbitrary code. However, many hair length rules in schools have been abolished or loosened, following nationwide student protests in the late 2010s.

== Past laws ==
=== Albania ===
During his regime, Enver Hoxha banned all hair longer than 4 cm (1.6 in) for men, as well as all beards. No man could enter the country whilst wearing one of the banned hair styles.

=== British North America ===
Long hair for men was illegal in the Massachusetts Bay Colony starting in 1634.

=== China ===
The Han Chinese first Ming dynasty emperor Zhu Yuanzhang passed a law on mandatory hairstyle on 24 September 1392, mandating that all males grow their hair long and making it illegal for them to shave part of their foreheads while leaving strands of hair which was the Mongol style. The penalty for both the barber and the person who was shaved and his sons was castration if they cut their hair and their families were to be sent to the borders for exile. This helped eradicate the partially shaved Mongol hairstyles and enforced the long Han hairstyle.

In Qing dynasty China, all male subjects of all ethnicities were required to keep their hair in a long braid and to shave the front of their scalp. Those who resisted were subject to execution for treason.

Many Chinese men stopped sporting the Queue braid tonsure hairstyle, in favor of short western hairstyles, following the collapse the Qing Dynasty in the 1910s which was succeeded by the Republic of China.

=== Czechoslovakia ===
Following the Prague Spring of 1968, Western 1960s counterculture inspired the Mánička subculture amongst Czechoslovak youth. The long hairstyles associated with this was discouraged and suppressed by the authorities, who saw it as a subversive Western cultural influence.

=== Japan ===
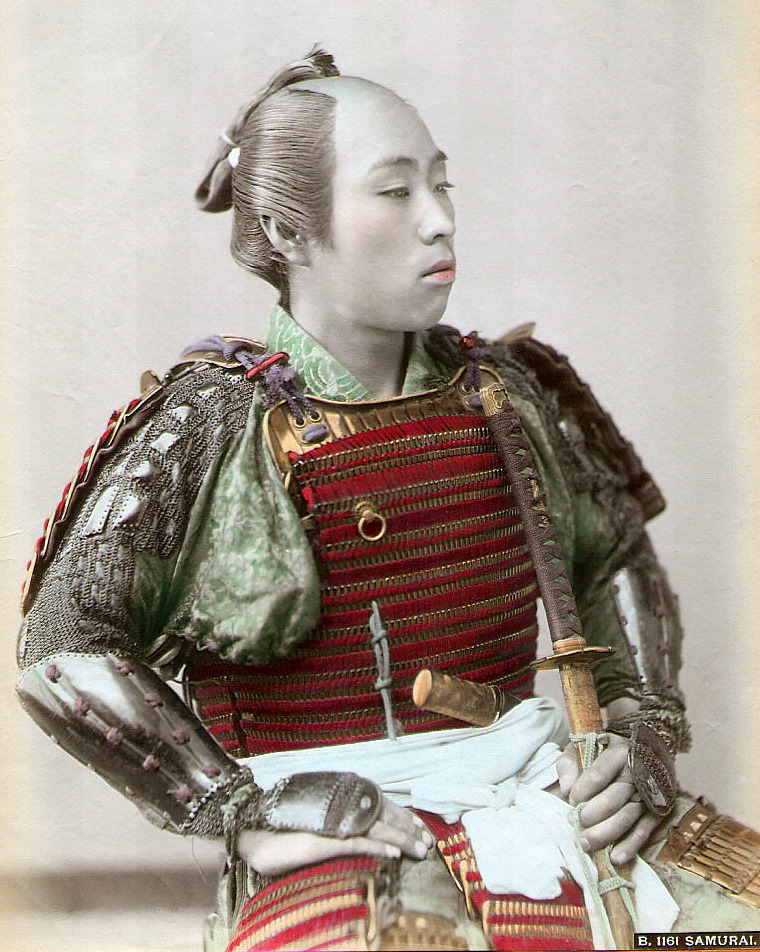
A 19th-century samurai with a chonmage

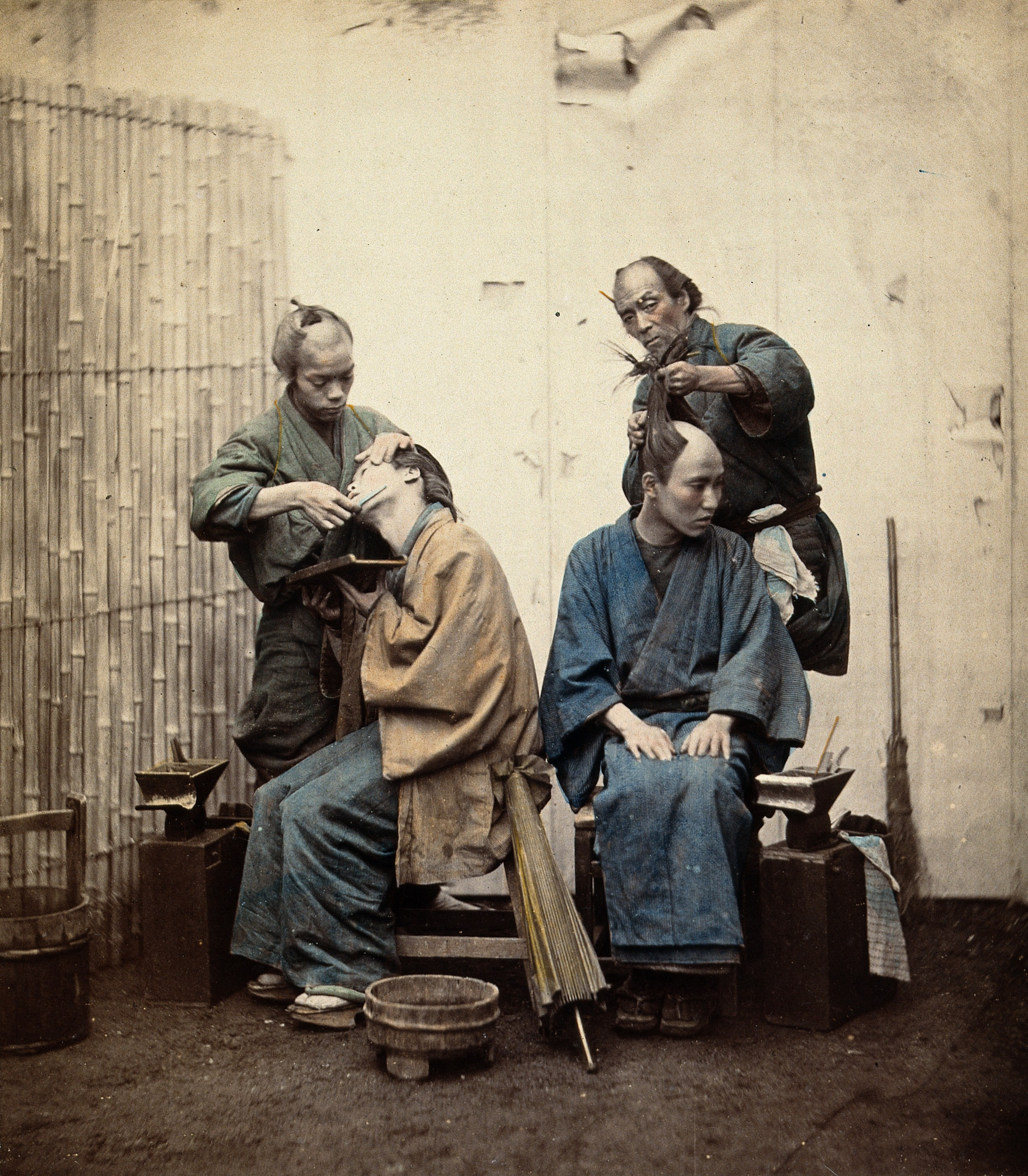
A Japanese barbershop in the 19th century

In the Edo period (1603–1867) of Japan, the Tokugawa Shogunate passed orders for Japanese men to shave the pate on the front of their head (the chonmage hairstyle) and shave their beards, facial hair and side whiskers. This was similar to the Qing dynasty queue order imposed by Dorgon making men shave the pates on the front of their heads. During the fourth year of the Meiji period in 1871, Emperor Meiji issued the Dampatsurei Edict which abolished the chonmage hairstyle. As a result of the decree which was issued as part of the Meiji Restoration, all Japanese men were forced to chop off their topknots and switch to short Western hairstyles in addition to switching to Western clothing. The chonmage was abandoned along with the samurai class in the 1870s, as a result of the Meiji Restoration and modernization of Japan. However, this decree/edict abolishing the chonmage hairstyle did not apply to sumo wrestlers as they are permitted to continue sporting chonmage into the modern era.

=== Malaysia ===
Long hair was a major trait of the subculture around rock kapak, a genre of local rock music taking heavily elements from glam rock and hard rock popular in the 1980s to 1990s. This genre was considered a nuisance by the conservative Malaysian government who saw the subculture surrounding it as "antisocial": the public broadcaster Radio Televisyen Malaysia under Information Minister Mohamad Rahmat in 1992 decreed a ban of long-haired performers on its channels, two of these artists Awie (of the band Wings) and Amy (of Search) agreed to have their long hair cut live on television on condition of being allowed to perform on RTM.

=== Russia ===
As part of his drive to modernise and Westernise Tsarist Russia, Peter the Great imposed a beard tax in 1698 to encourage Russian men to shave off their beards. Men who kept their beards but refused to pay the tax were forcibly shaven.

=== Singapore ===
There was a national ban of long hair for men in Singapore; the reason was the growth of hippie subculture worldwide. The law has since changed and nowadays, men can display any kind of hairstyle.

=== South Korea ===
In 1973, South Korea under Park Chung-hee introduced the Minor Offenses Act which limited the length of hair for males and mandated a minimum length of skirts for females. There are no specific definitions of acceptable hair length, and violators were often taken to police stations and had their hair cut against their will.

=== Vietnam ===
The Han Chinese referred to the various non-Han "barbarian" peoples of north Vietnam and southern China as "Yue" (Viet) or Baiyue, saying they possessed common habits like adapting to water, having their hair cropped short and tattooed. The Han also said their language was "animal shrieking" and that they lacked morals, modesty, civilization and culture.

When Han Chinese ruled the Vietnamese in the Fourth Chinese domination of Vietnam due to the Ming dynasty's conquest during the Ming–Hồ War they imposed the Han Chinese style of men wearing long hair on short-haired Vietnamese men. Vietnamese were ordered to stop cutting and instead grow their hair long and switch to Han Chinese clothing in only a month by a Ming official. Ming administrators said their mission was to civilize the unorthodox Vietnamese barbarians. A royal edict was issued by Vietnam in 1474 forbidding Vietnamese from adopting foreign languages, hairstyles and clothes like that of the Lao, Champa or the Ming "Northerners". The edict was recorded in the 1479 Complete Chronicle of Dai Viet of Ngô Sĩ Liên in the Later Lê dynasty.

== See also ==
=== Hair related ===
- Beard oil
- Discrimination based on hair texture
- Facial hair in the military
- List of facial hairstyles
- List of hairstyles
- Moustache styles
- Pigtail Ordinance

=== General ===
- Dress code
- Clothing laws by country
  - Hijab by country
- Emo killings in Iraq
