= Goatee =

Style of beard

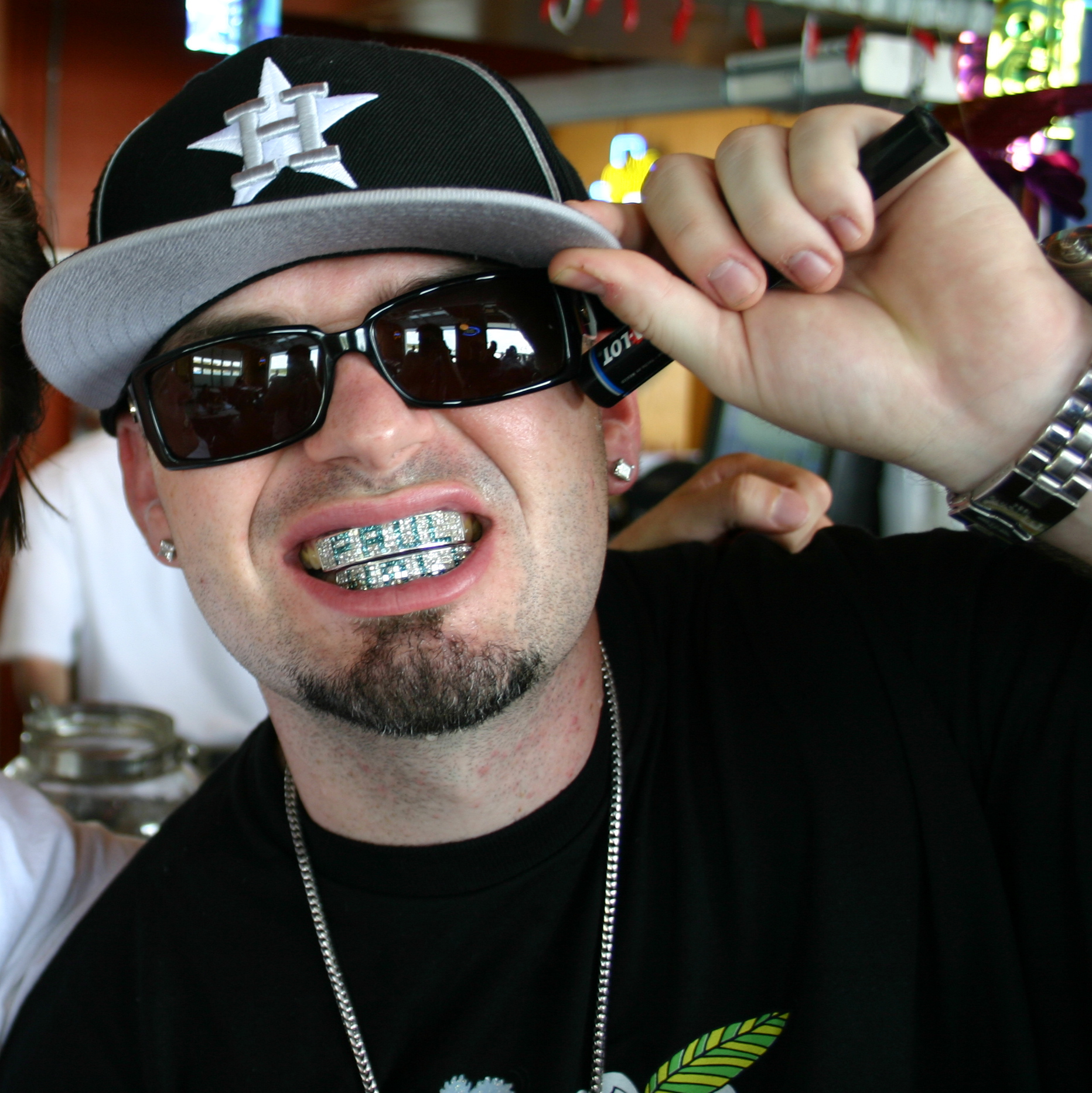
Rapper Paul Wall with a goatee

A goatee is a style of facial hair incorporating hair on the chin entirely. The exact nature of the style has varied according to time and culture.

== Description ==
Until the late 20th century, the term goatee was used to refer solely to a beard formed by a tuft of hair on the chin—as on the chin of a goat, hence the term 'goatee'. By the 1990s, the word had become an umbrella term used to refer to any facial hair style incorporating hair on the chin but not the cheeks; there is debate over whether this style is correctly called a goatee or a Van Dyke.

== History ==
The style dates back to ancient Greece and ancient Rome. The god Pan was traditionally depicted with goat-like features, including a goatee. When Christianity became the dominant religion and began copying imagery from pagan myth, Satan was given the likeness of Pan, leading to Satan traditionally being depicted with a goatee in medieval art and Renaissance art.

The goatee would not enjoy widespread popularity again until the 1950s, when it became a defining trait of the beatniks in the post–World War II United States. The style remained popular amongst the counter-culture until the 1960s before falling out of favor again. In the 1990s, goatees with incorporated mustaches became fashionable for men across all socioeconomic classes and professions.

== Gallery ==
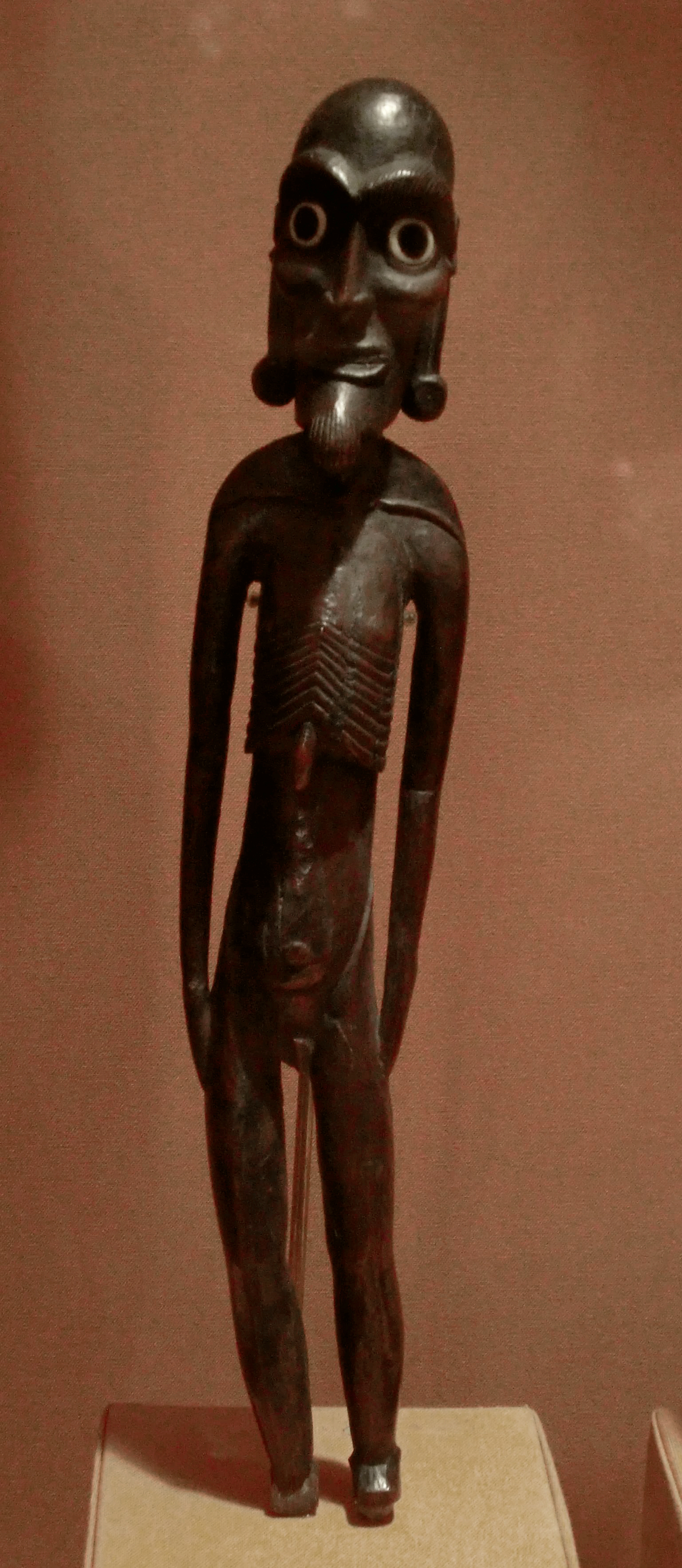
A Moai kavakava from Easter Island

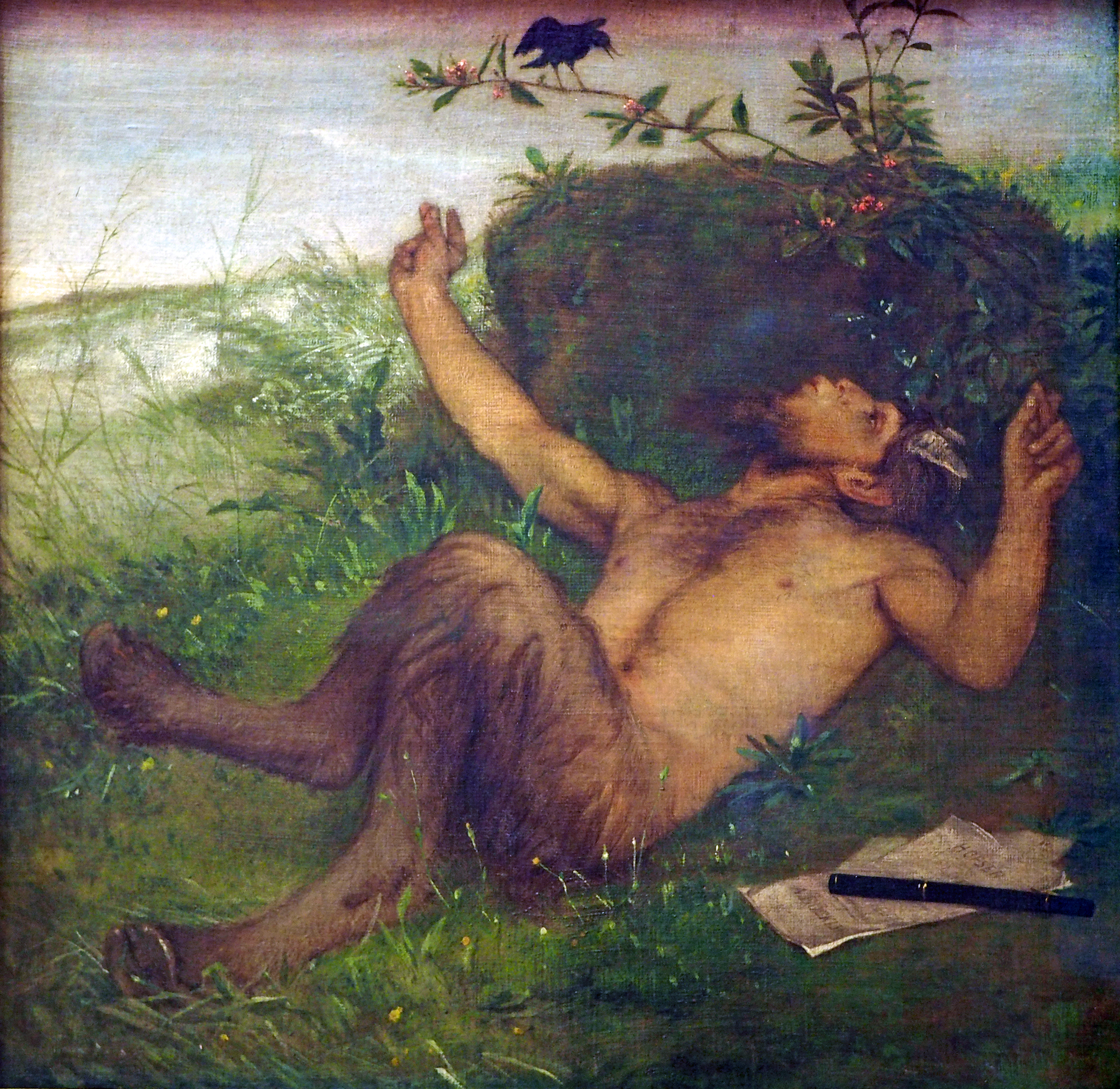
Painting of Pan by Arnold Böcklin (1864–65)

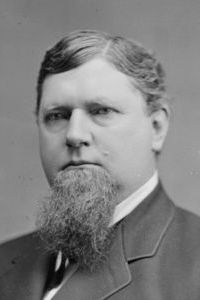
Henry M. Hoyt (c. 1865–80)

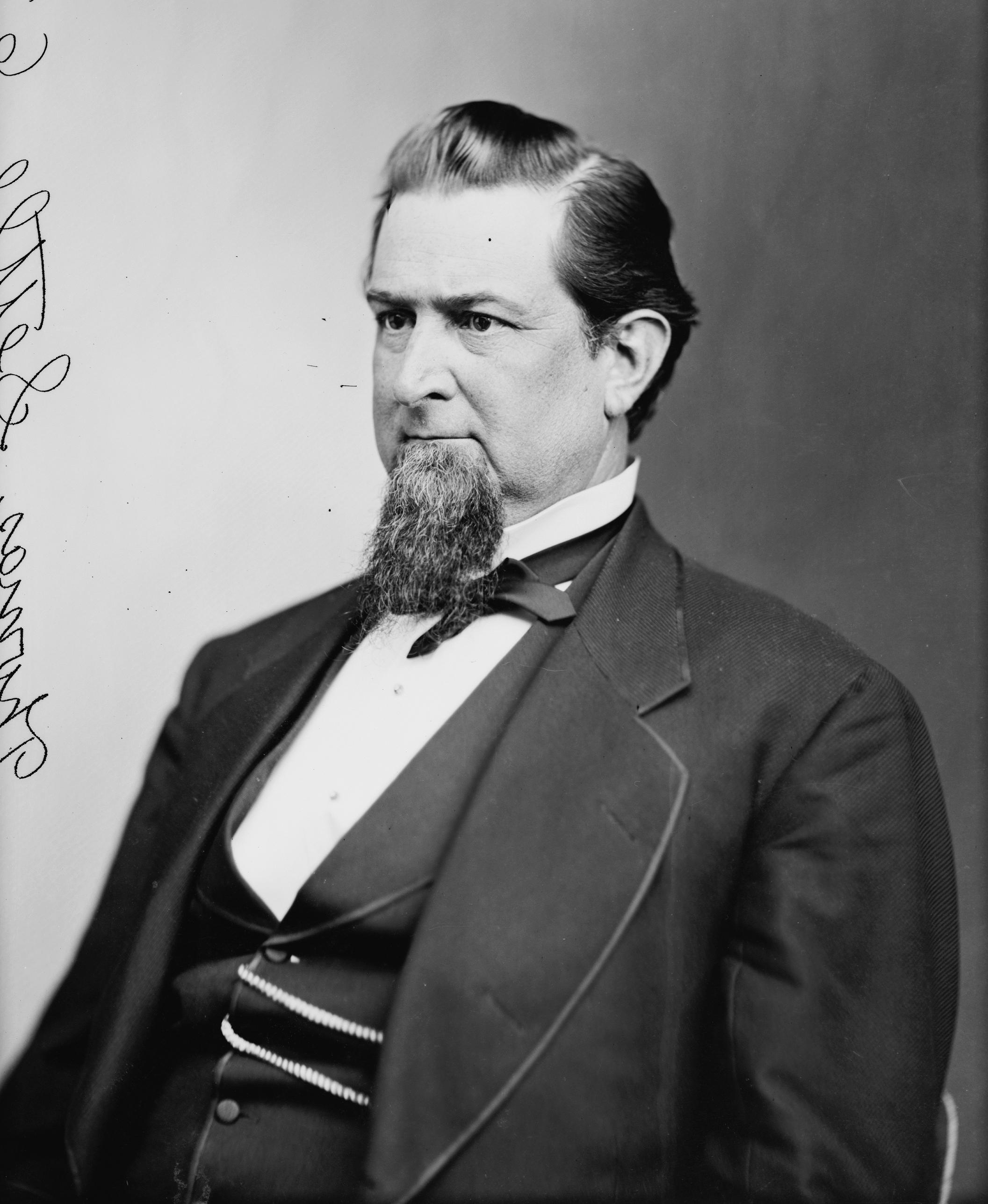
Thomas Settle (c. 1865–80)

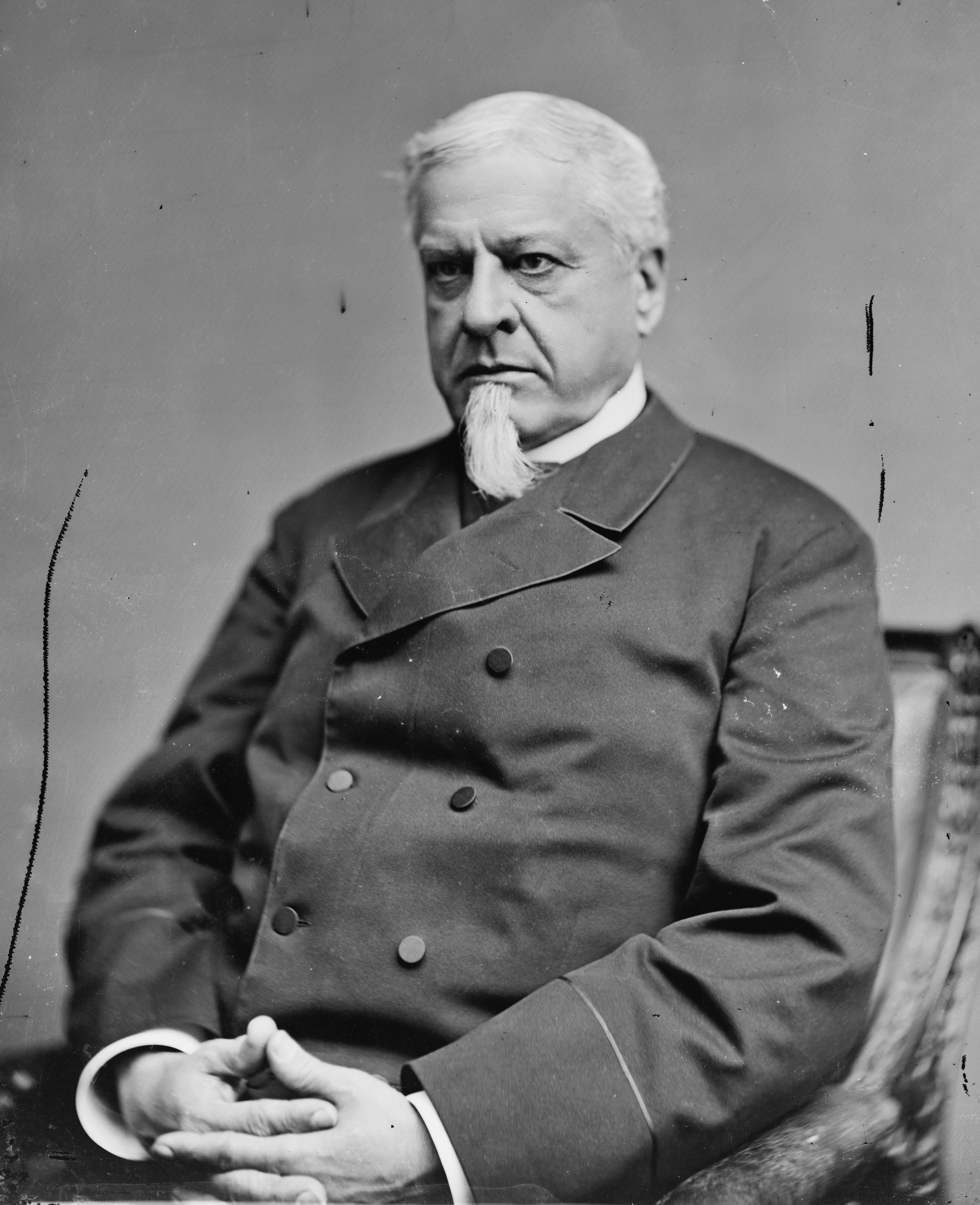
William H. Hunt (c. 1865–80)

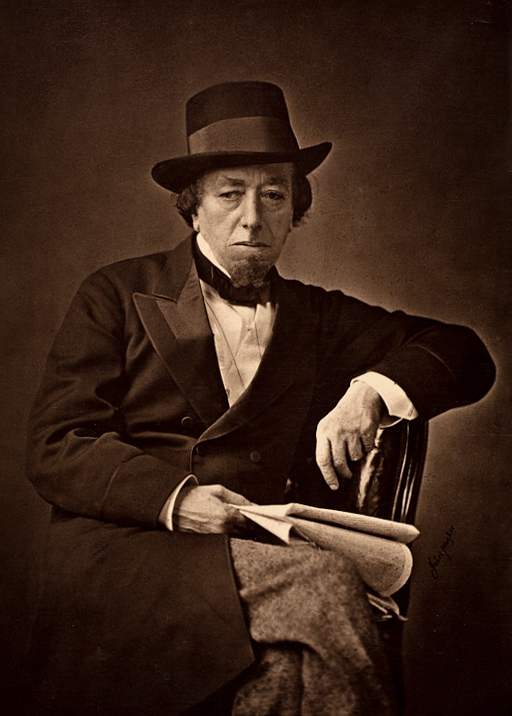
Benjamin Disraeli (1878)

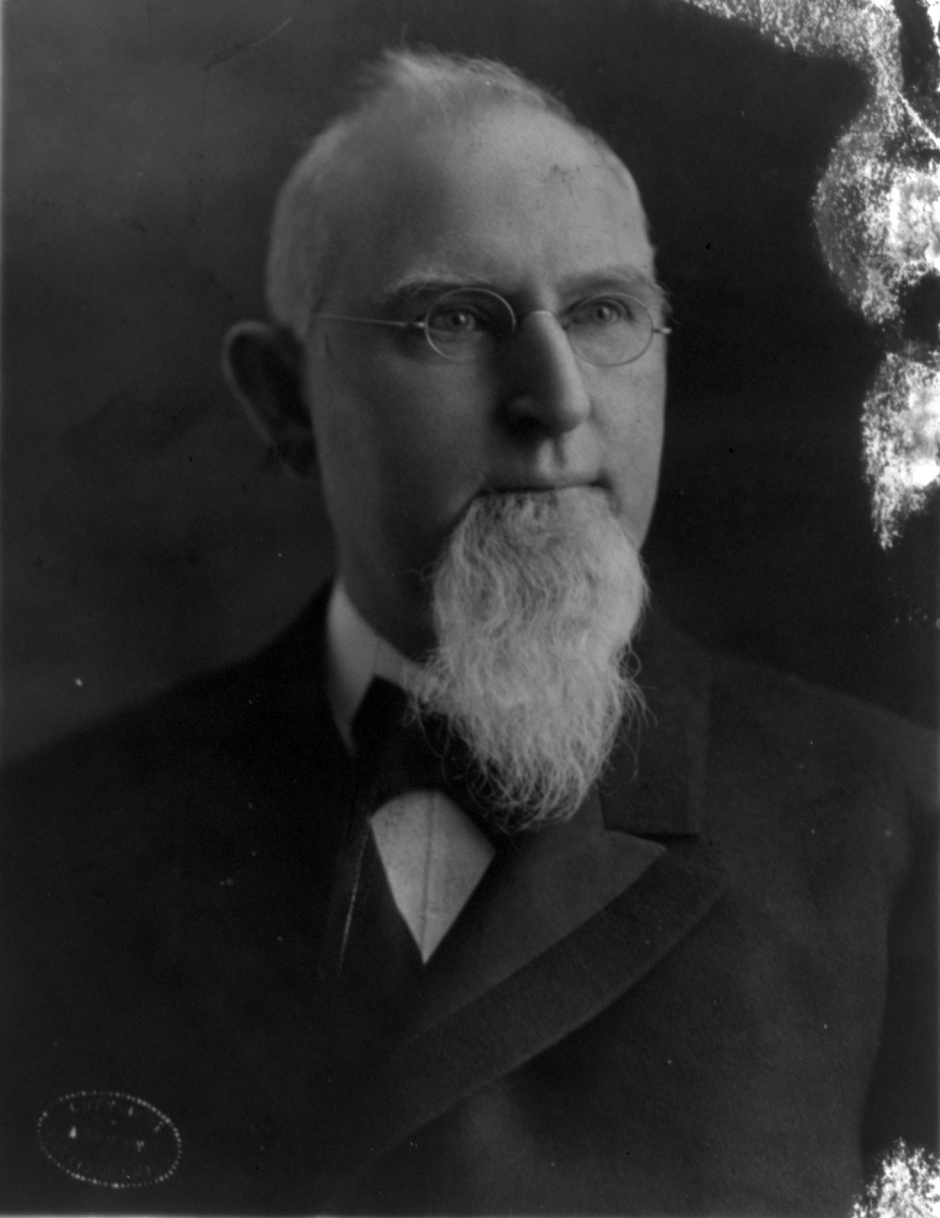
Thomas Henry Carter (1909)

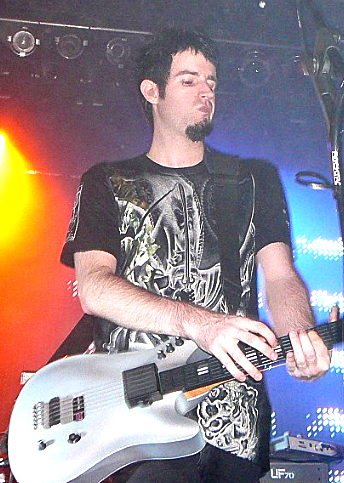
Rob Swire (2009)

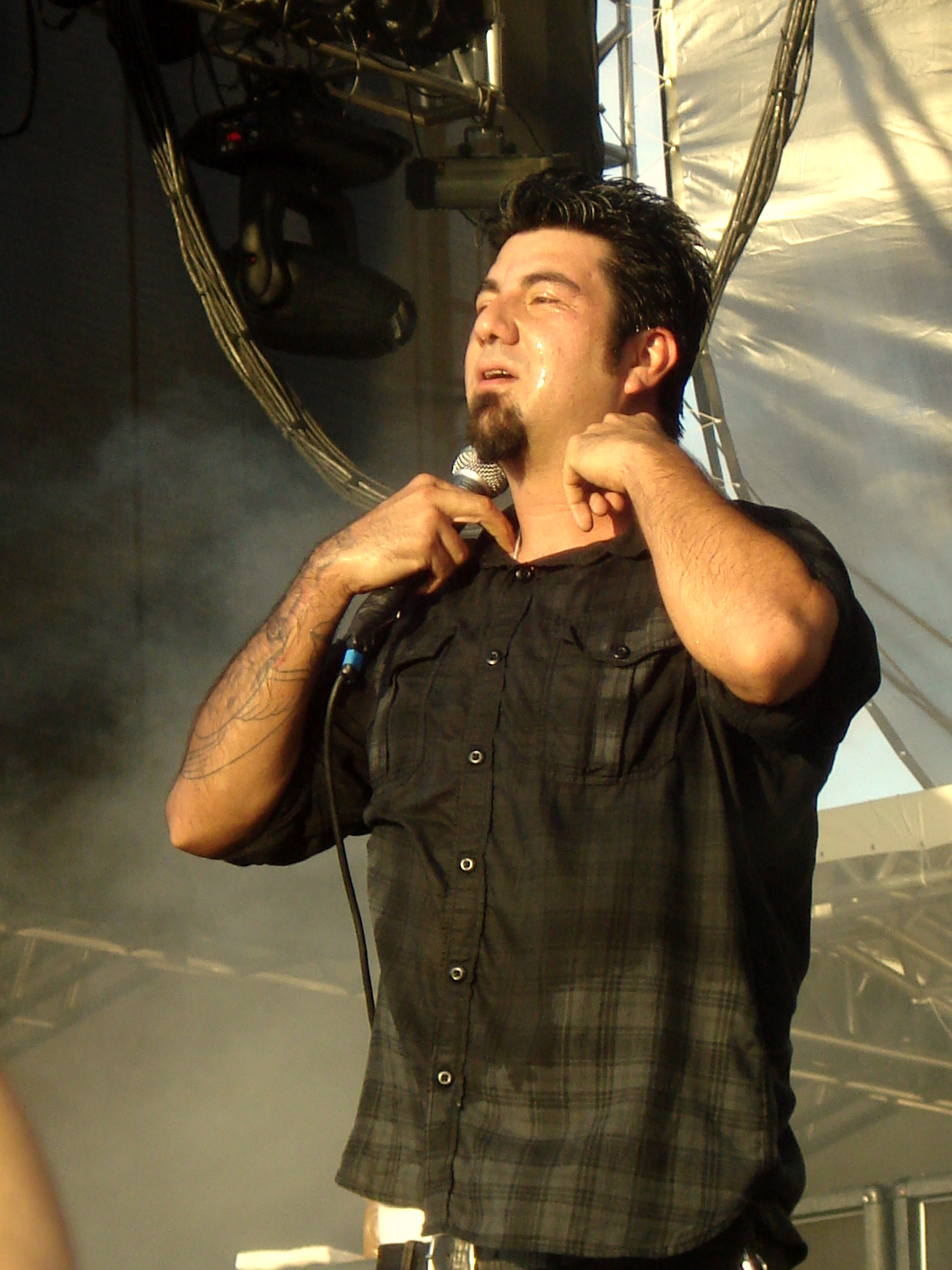
Chino Moreno (2009)

== See also ==
- List of facial hairstyles
- Beard
- Moustache
- Sideburns
- Soul patch
- Van Dyke beard
