= Van Dyke beard =

Style of beard comprising a moustache and a goatee with all hair on the cheeks shaven

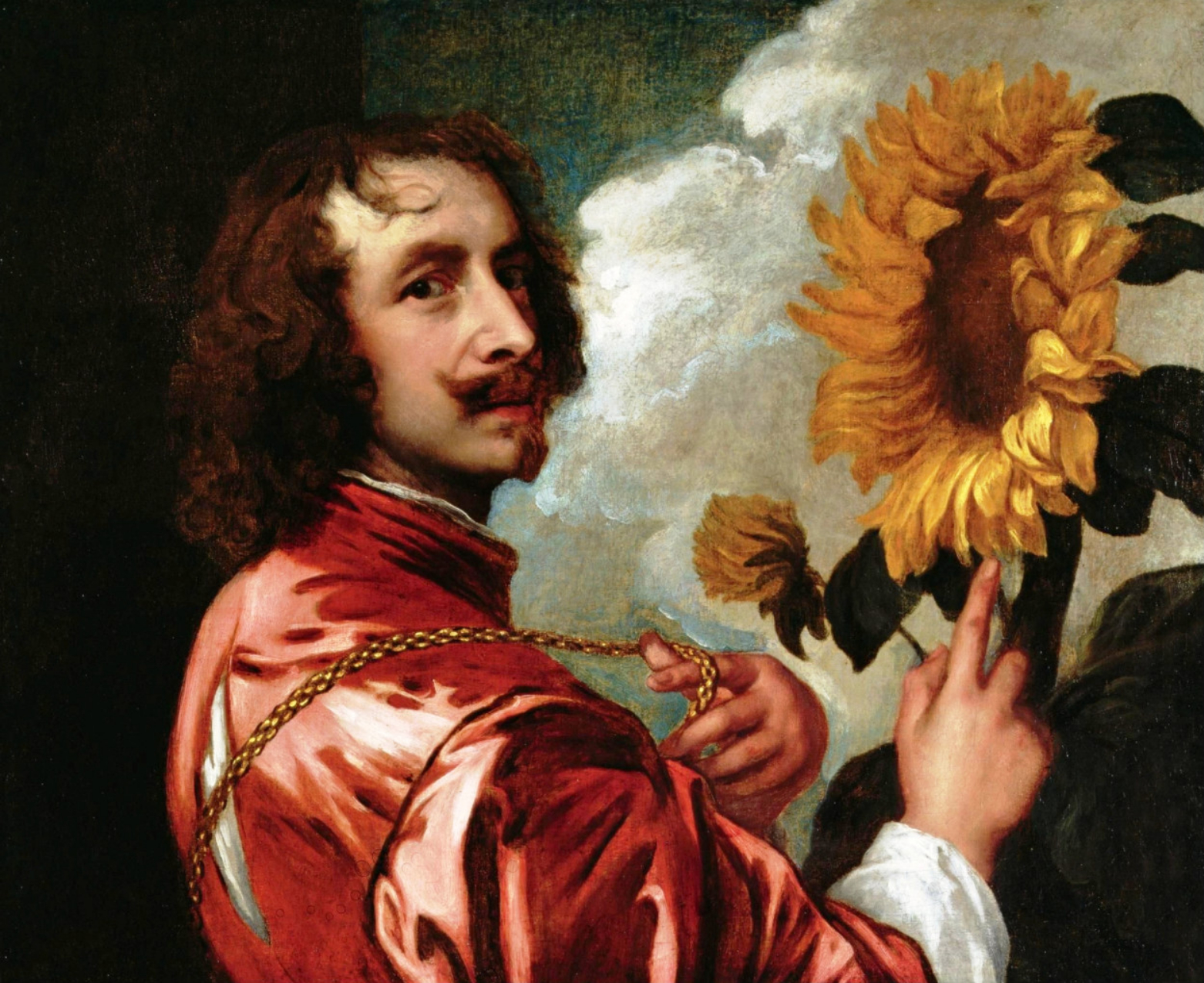
The Van Dyke beard is named after Anthony van Dyck.

A Van Dyke (sometimes spelled Vandyke, or Van Dyck) is a style of facial hair named after the 17th-century Flemish painter Anthony van Dyck (1599–1641). The artist's name is today normally spelt as "van Dyck", though there are many variants, but when the term for the beard became popular "Van Dyke" was more common in English. A Van Dyke specifically consists of any growth of both a moustache and goatee with all hair on the cheeks shaved. Even this particular style, though, has many variants, including a curled moustache versus a non-curled one and a soul patch versus none. The style is sometimes called a "Charlie" after King Charles I of England, who was painted with this type of beard by van Dyck. "Pike-devant" or "pickedevant" are other little-known synonyms for a Van Dyke beard.

== Popularity ==
This style of beard was popular in Europe in the 17th century. It died out in Britain with the Restoration, when French styles and wigs became popular. The Van Dyke beard style is named after the 17th-century Flemish painter Anthony van Dyck. For some time after, however, some men, known as "vow-beards", continued to wear them, vowing to wear them until the King did so again. It became popular in the United States in the 19th century. Columnist Edith Sessions Tupper, of the Chicago Chronicle (1895–1908), condemned this style, along with the goatee, as indicative of a man "who was selfish, sinister, and pompous as a peacock."

The style was worn by van Dyck himself and by many of the sitters for his portraits, including King Charles I of England. The Russian Marxist revolutionary Vladimir Lenin also wore a Van Dyke. The Van Dyke had a revival in the 19th century and was worn by several well-known figures, including General Custer (among other styles) and the actor Monty Woolley. Colonel Sanders would also qualify as having a Van Dyke.

Jonathan Hyde wore a Van Dyke when playing Van Pelt, a big game hunter, in Jumanji. The TV version of Jumanji featured its version of Van Pelt wearing a Van Dyke as well.

John Hurt wore a Van Dyke when playing the War Doctor on the Doctor Who episodes The Night of the Doctor and The Day of the Doctor.

Guy Fawkes, member of the Gunpowder Plot at the beginning of the 17th century, had a Van Dyke beard around the time period the namesake van Dyck was born; his face is still shown in public today by various movements via the stylised Guy Fawkes mask.

== Examples ==
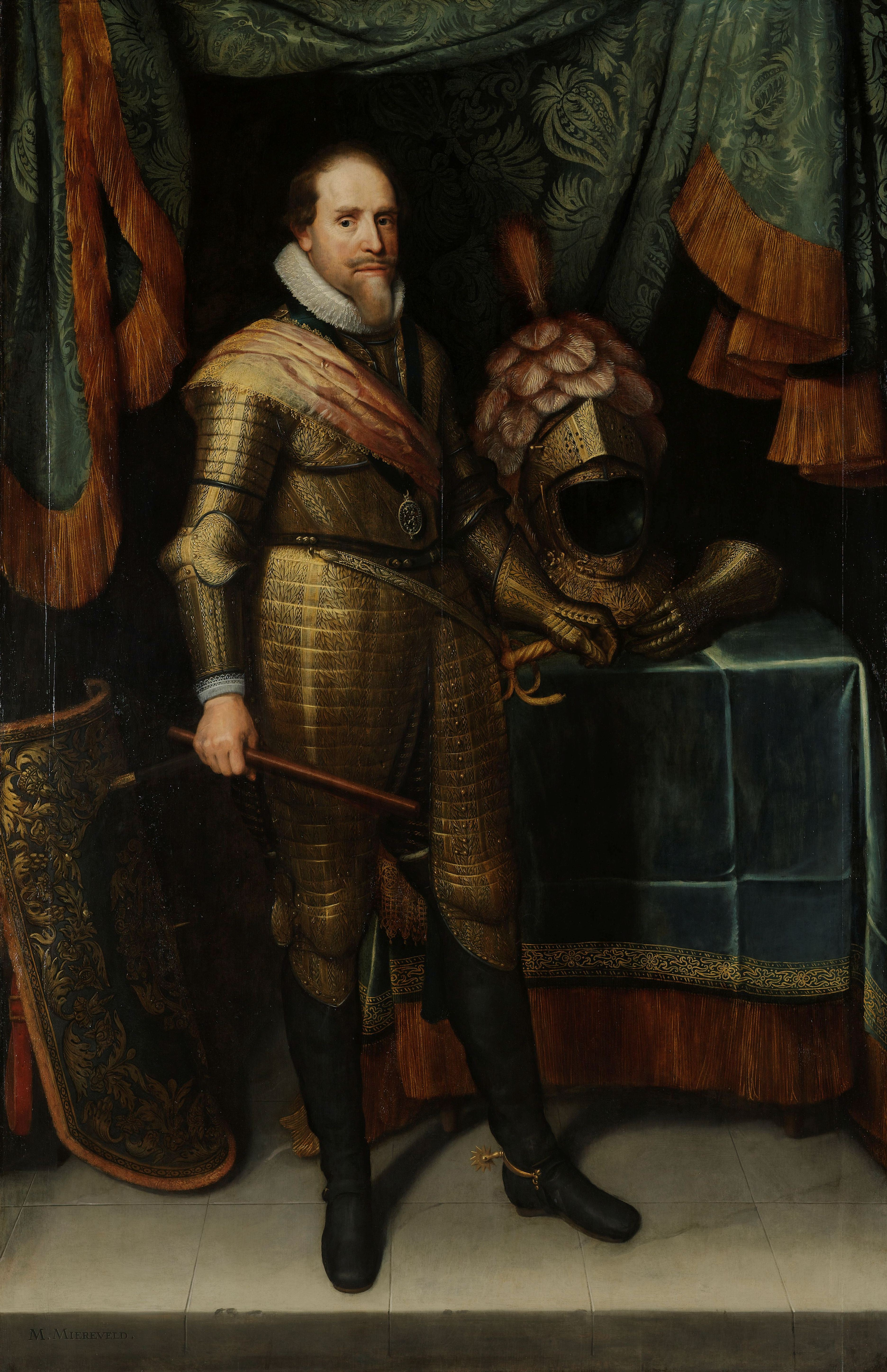
Maurice, Prince of Orange, by Michiel van Mierevelt (c. 1613–20)

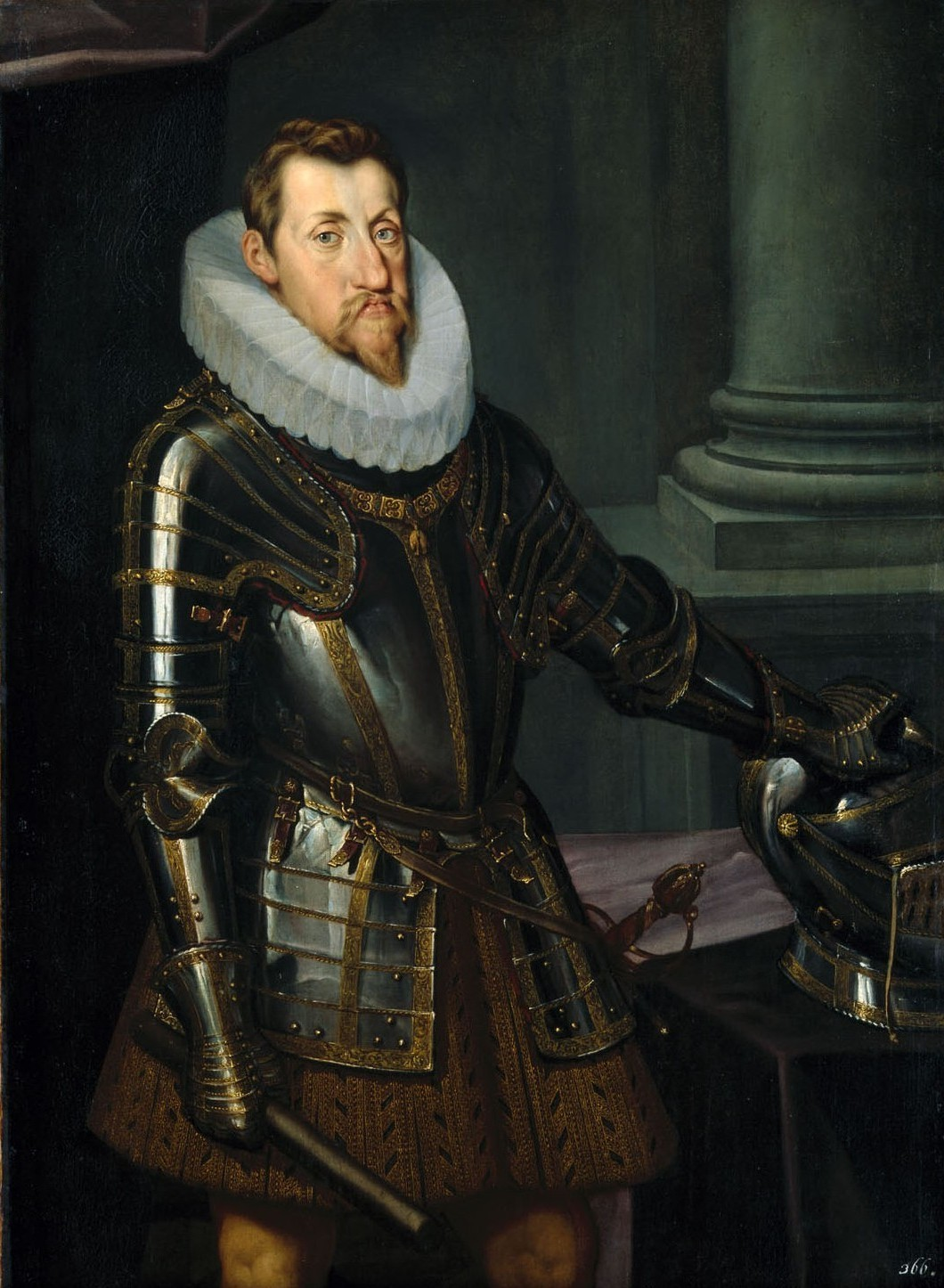
Ferdinand II, Holy Roman Emperor, unknown artist (1614)

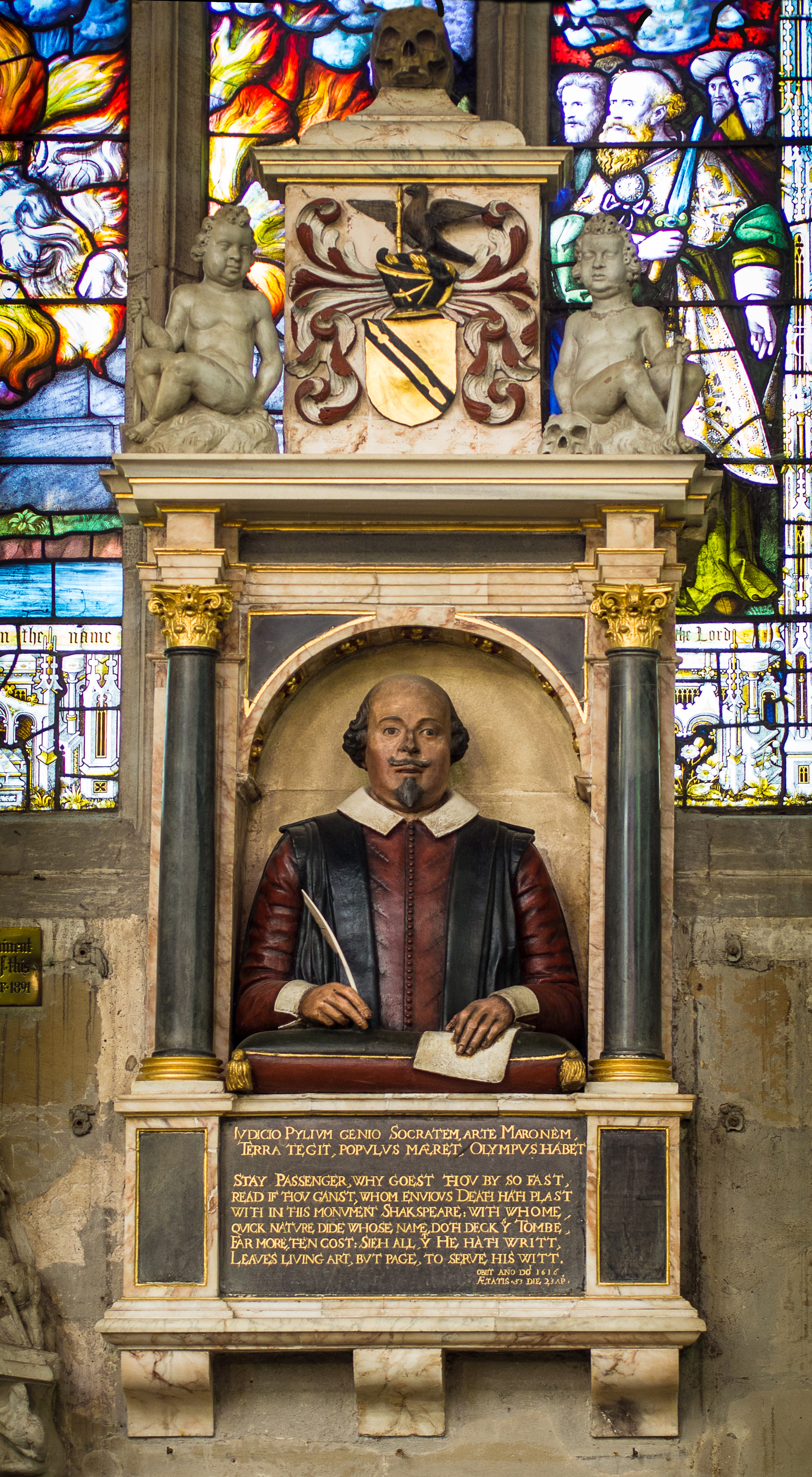
William Shakespeare, funeral monument (c. 1616)

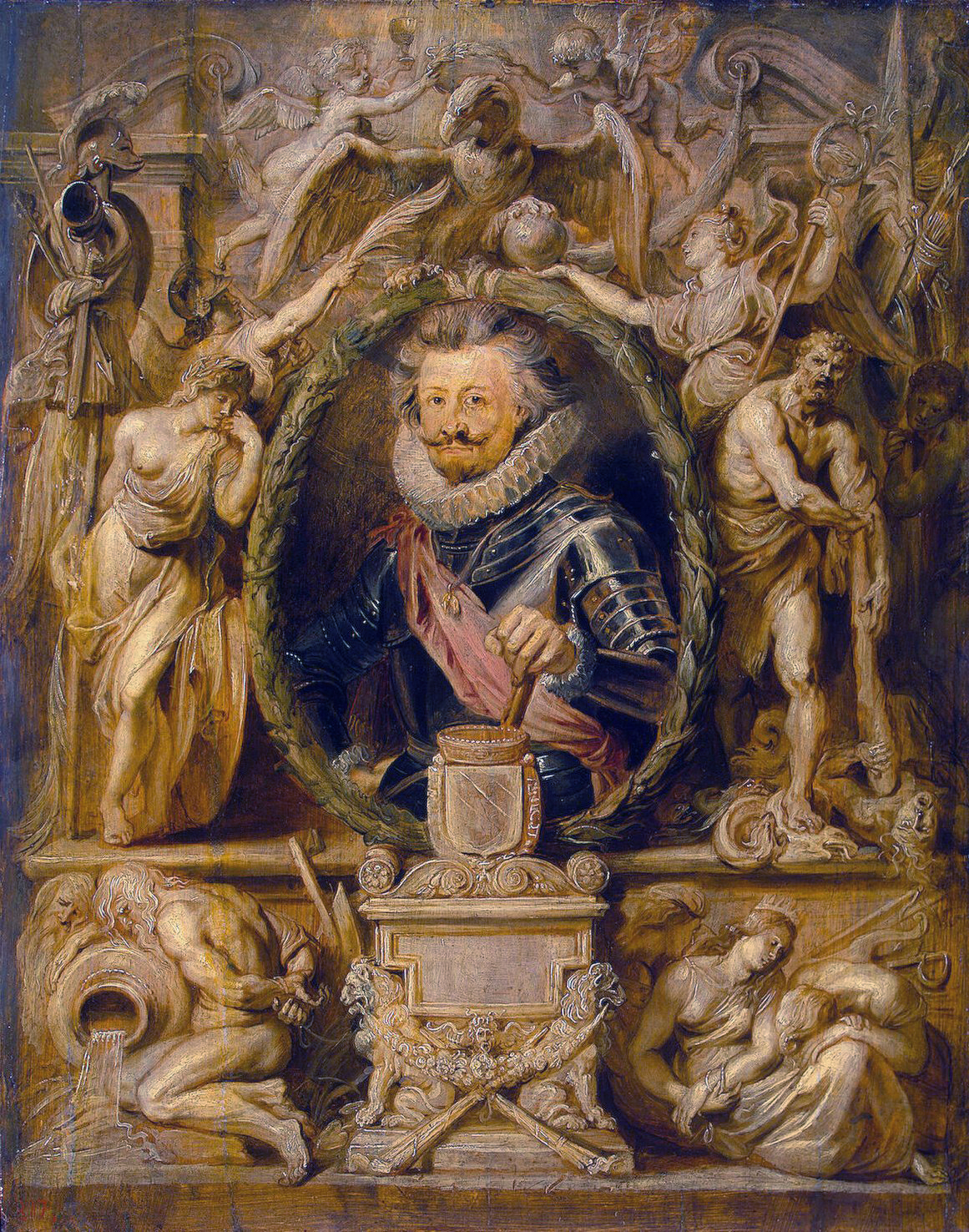
Charles Bonaventure de Longueval, Count of Bucquoy, by Peter Paul Rubens (1621)

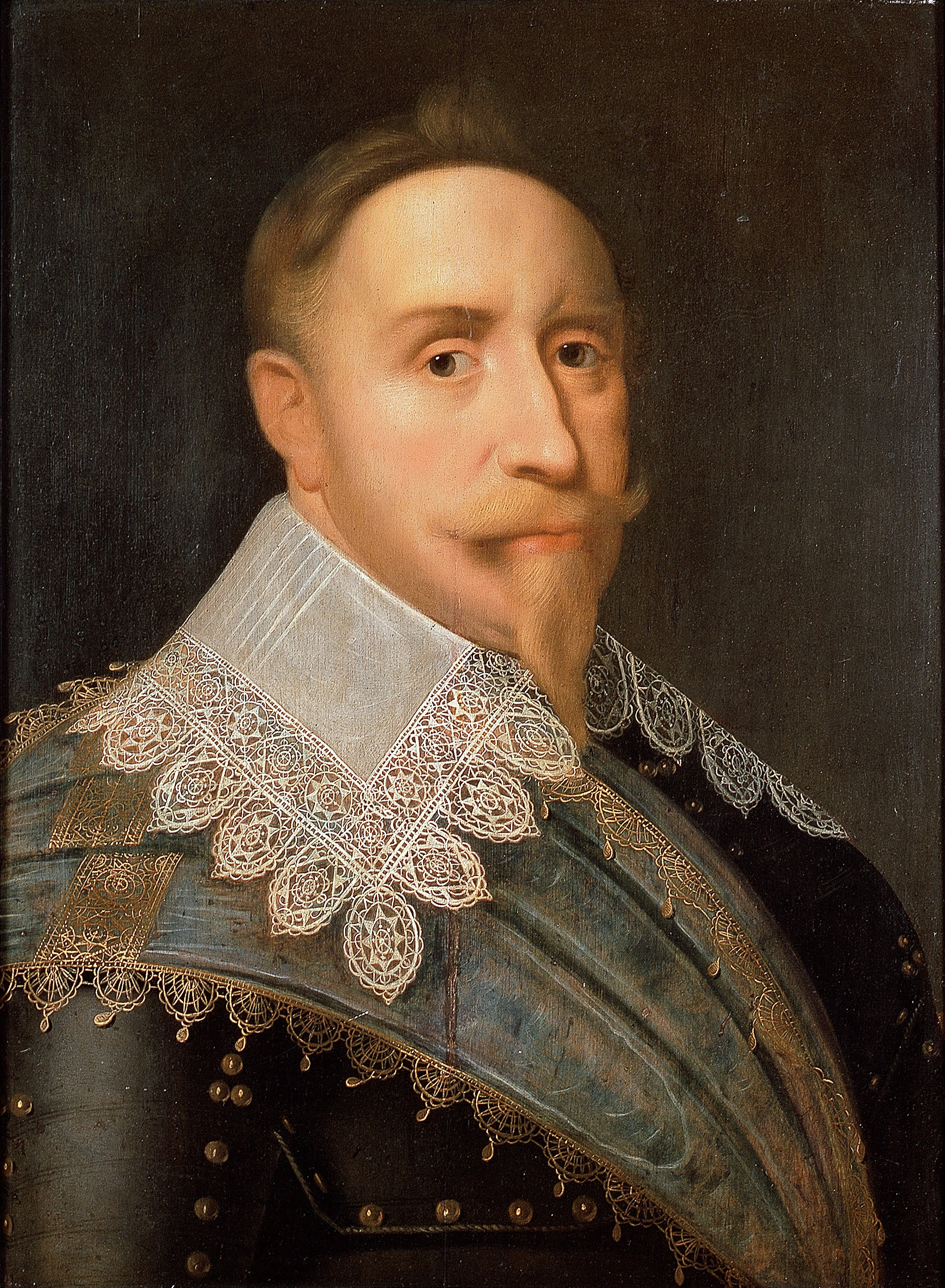
Gustavus Adolphus, attrib. Jacob Hoefnagel (1624)

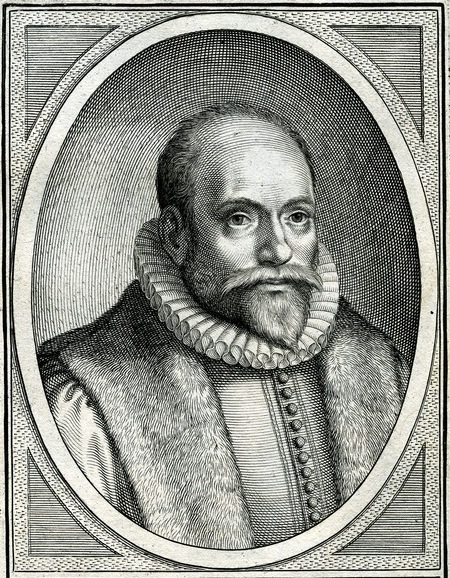
Jacobus Arminius, by Willem Isaacsz Swanenburg (1625)

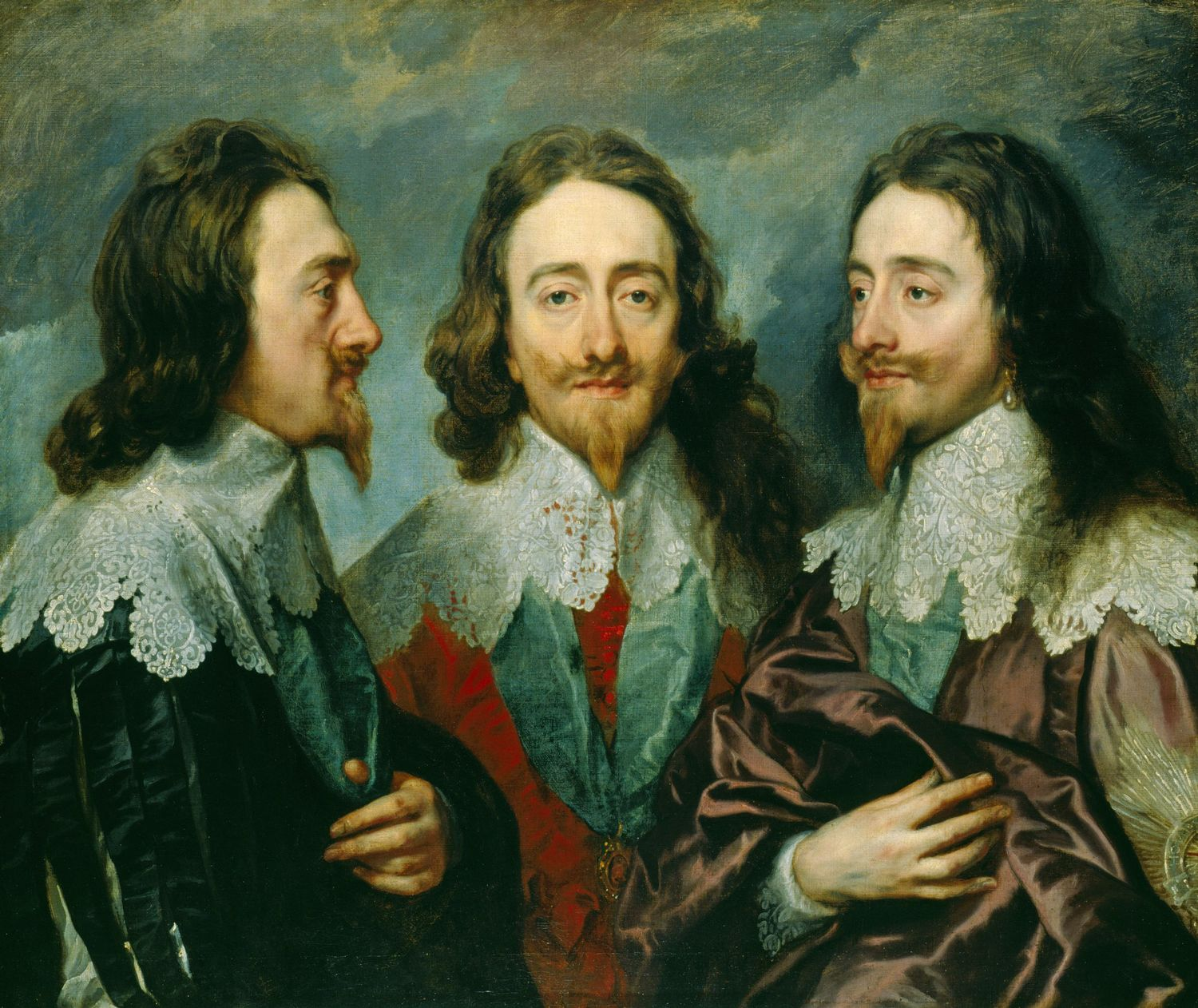
Charles I of England by Anthony van Dyck (1635-6)

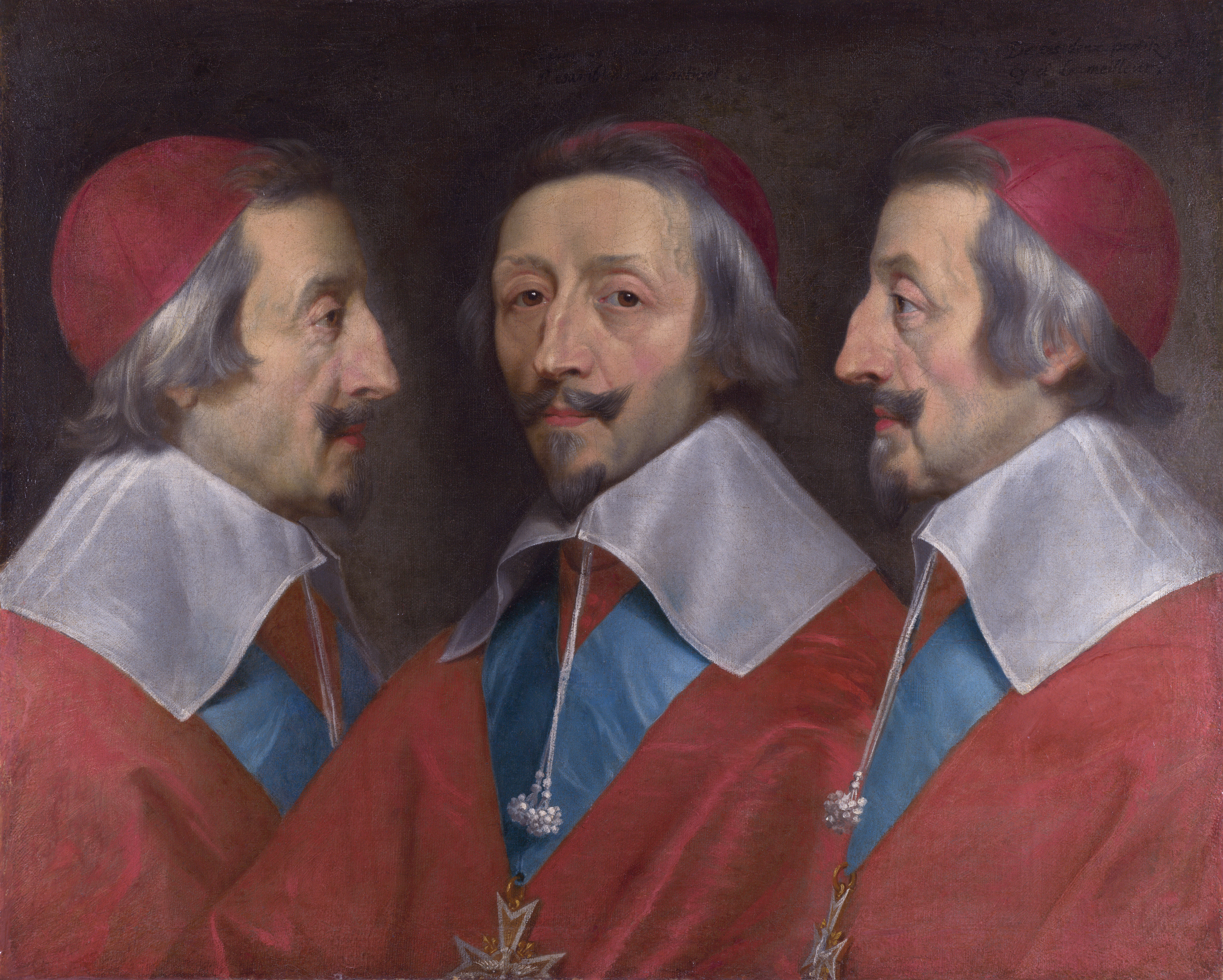
Cardinal de Richelieu, by Philippe de Champaigne (c. 1642)

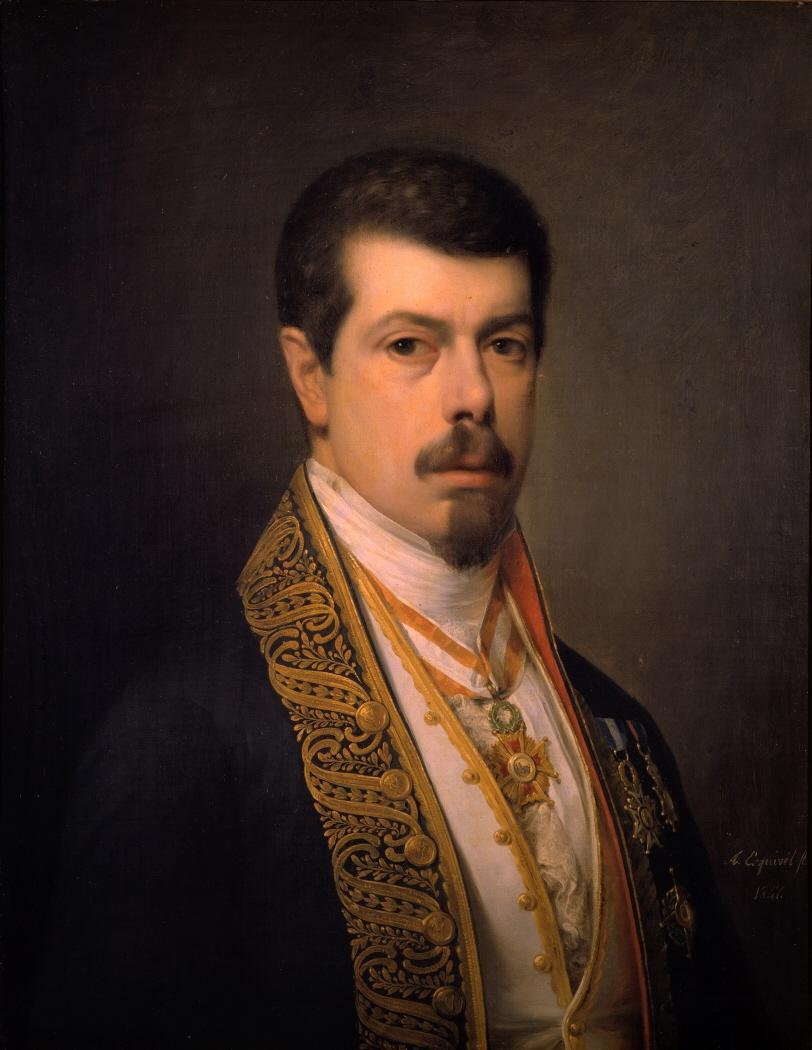
Antonio María Esquivel (1847)

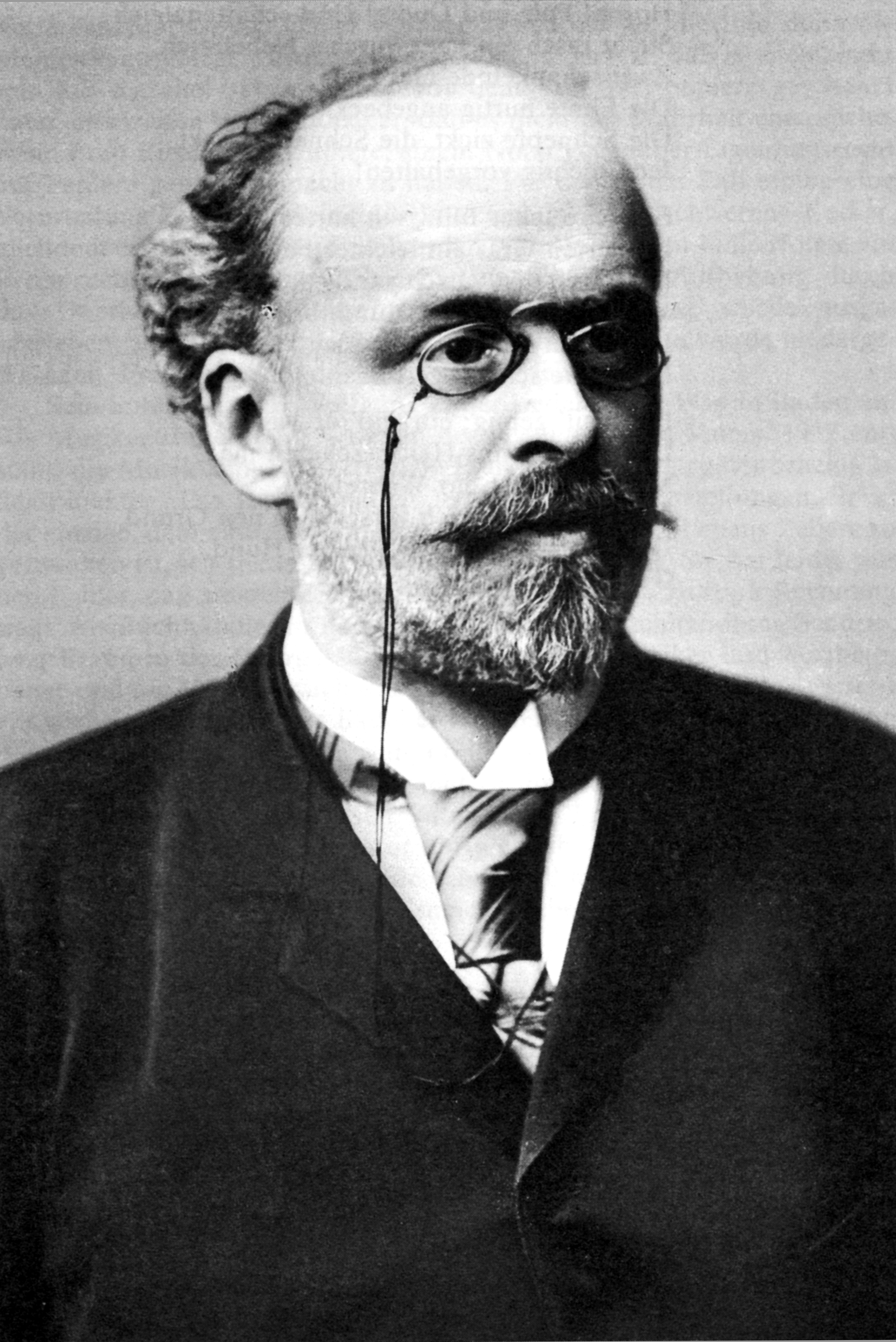
Carl Zeller

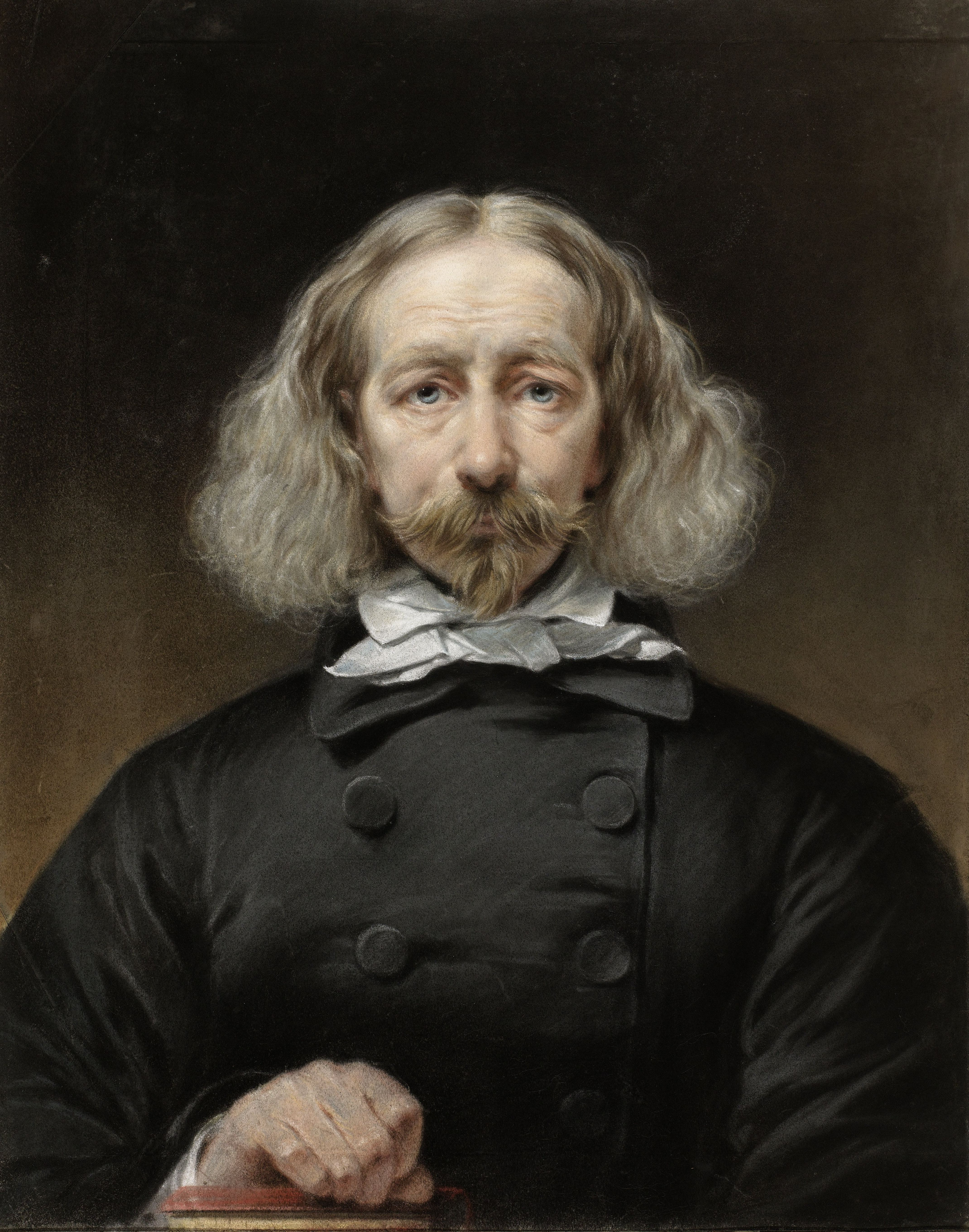
Self-portrait by Jean Augustin Daiwaille Dutch portrait painter (1801-1850)

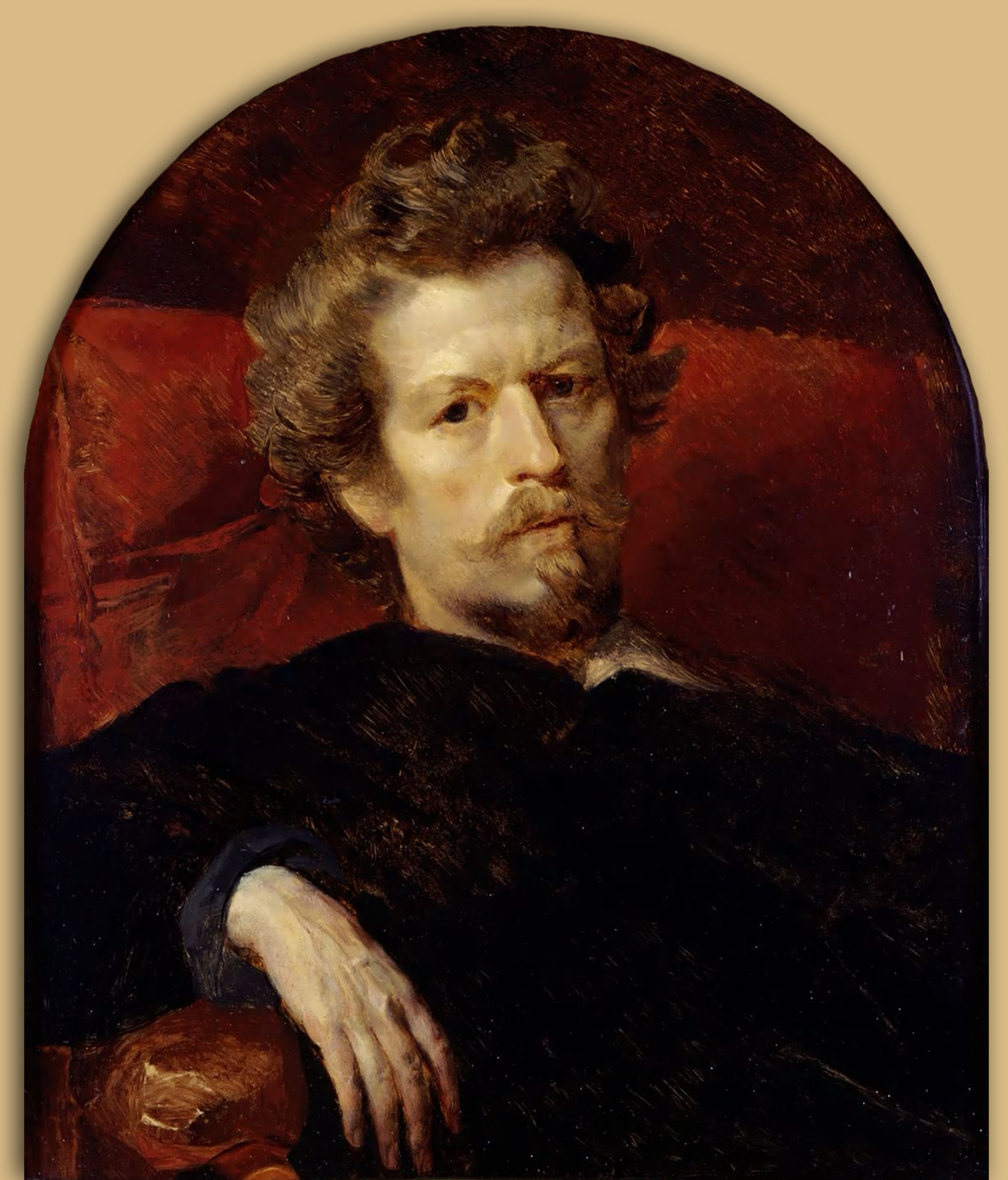
Self-portrait by Karl Bryullov Russian painter (1848)

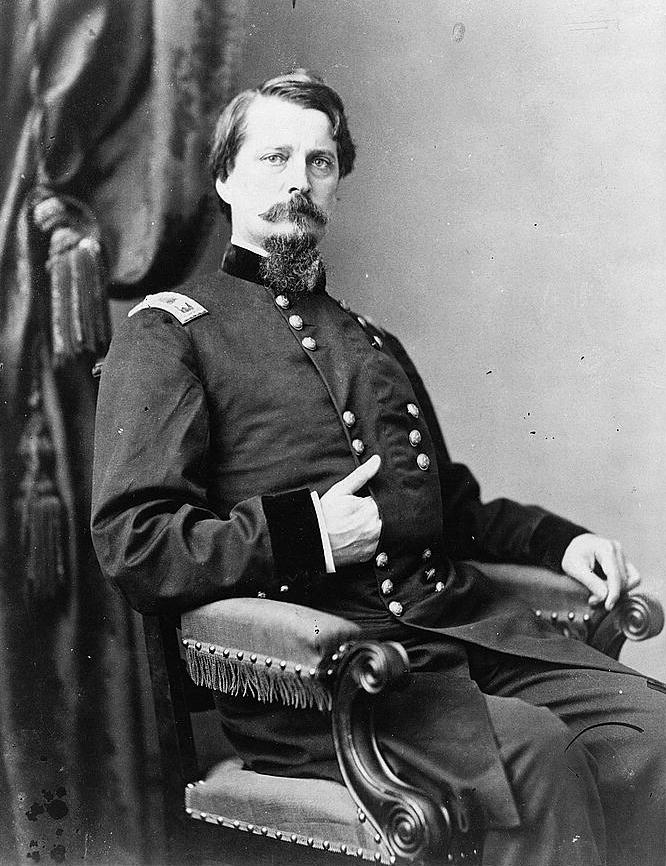
Winfield Scott Hancock (1863)

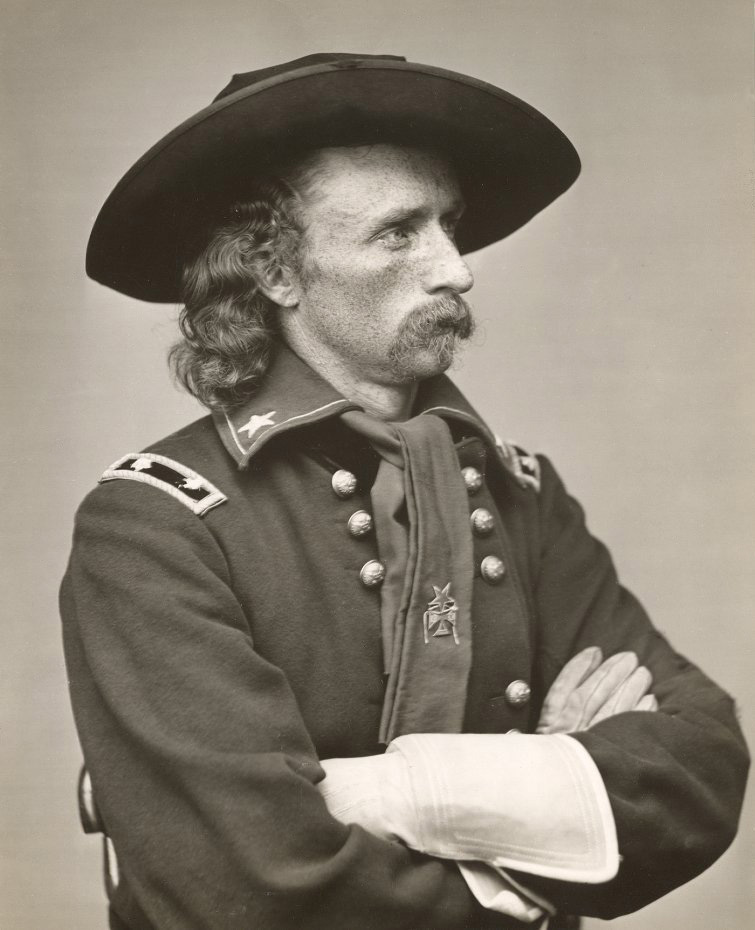
George Armstrong Custer (1865)

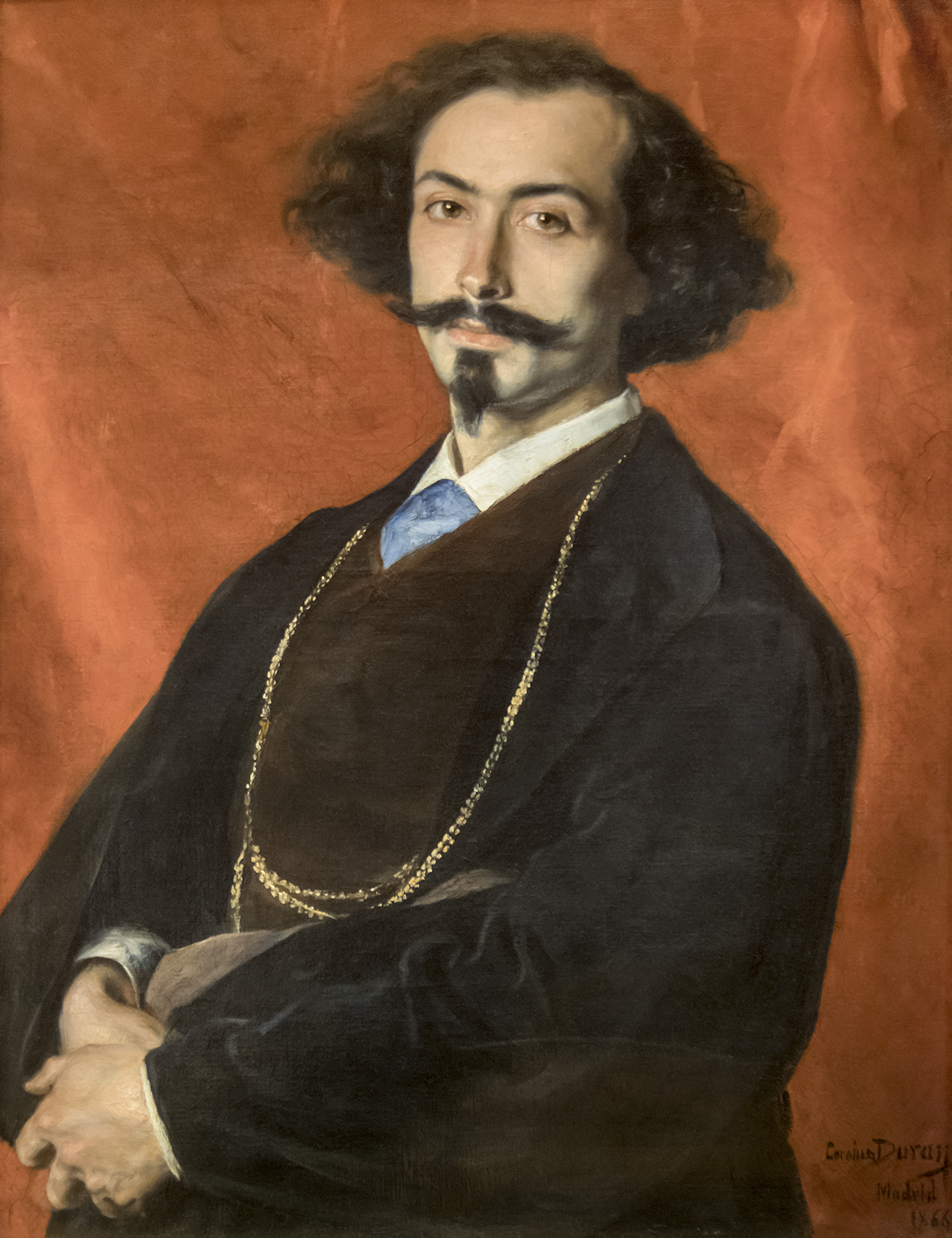
Matías Moreno (1866)

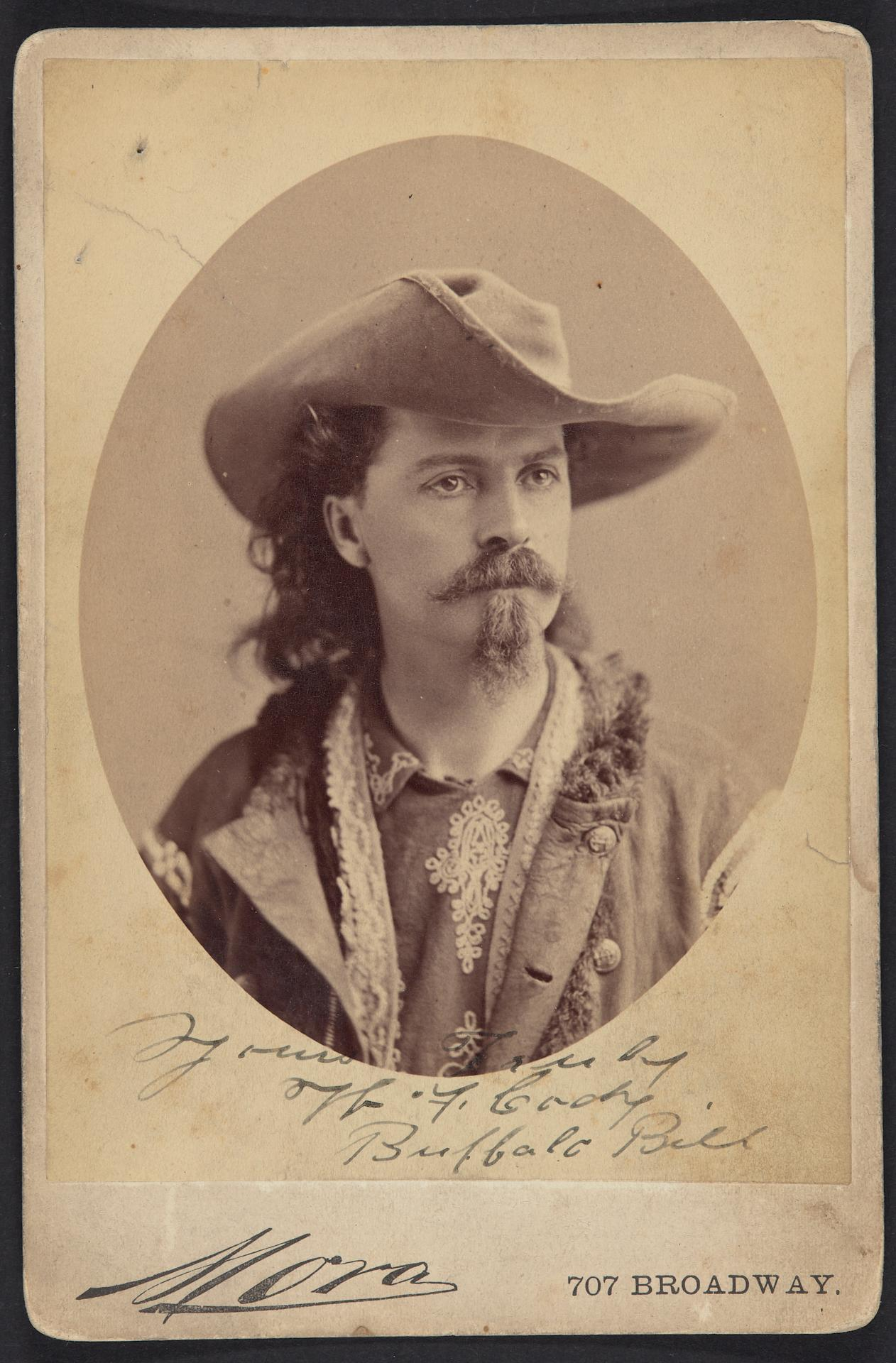
Buffalo Bill (William Cody) (c. 1875)

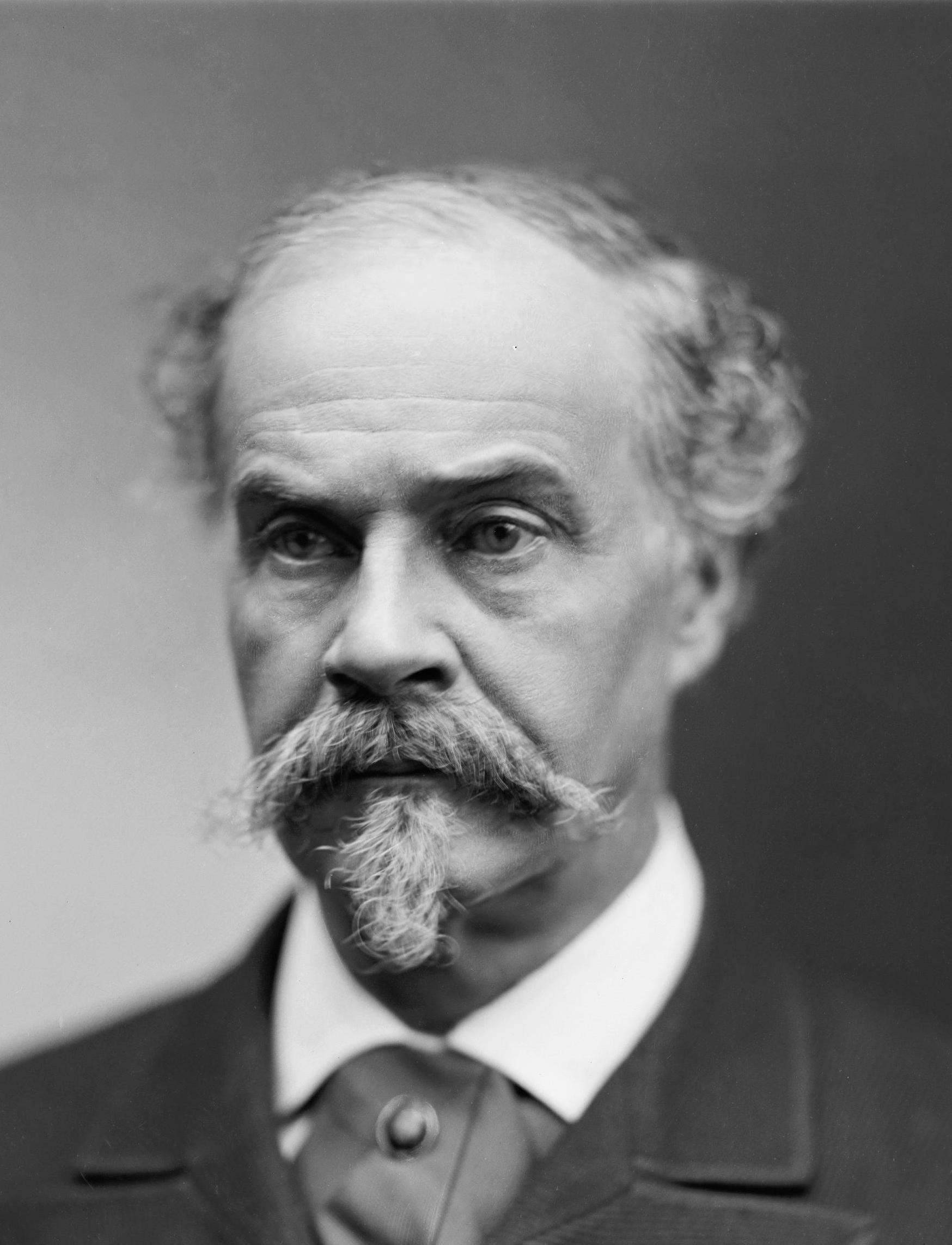
William Wetmore Story

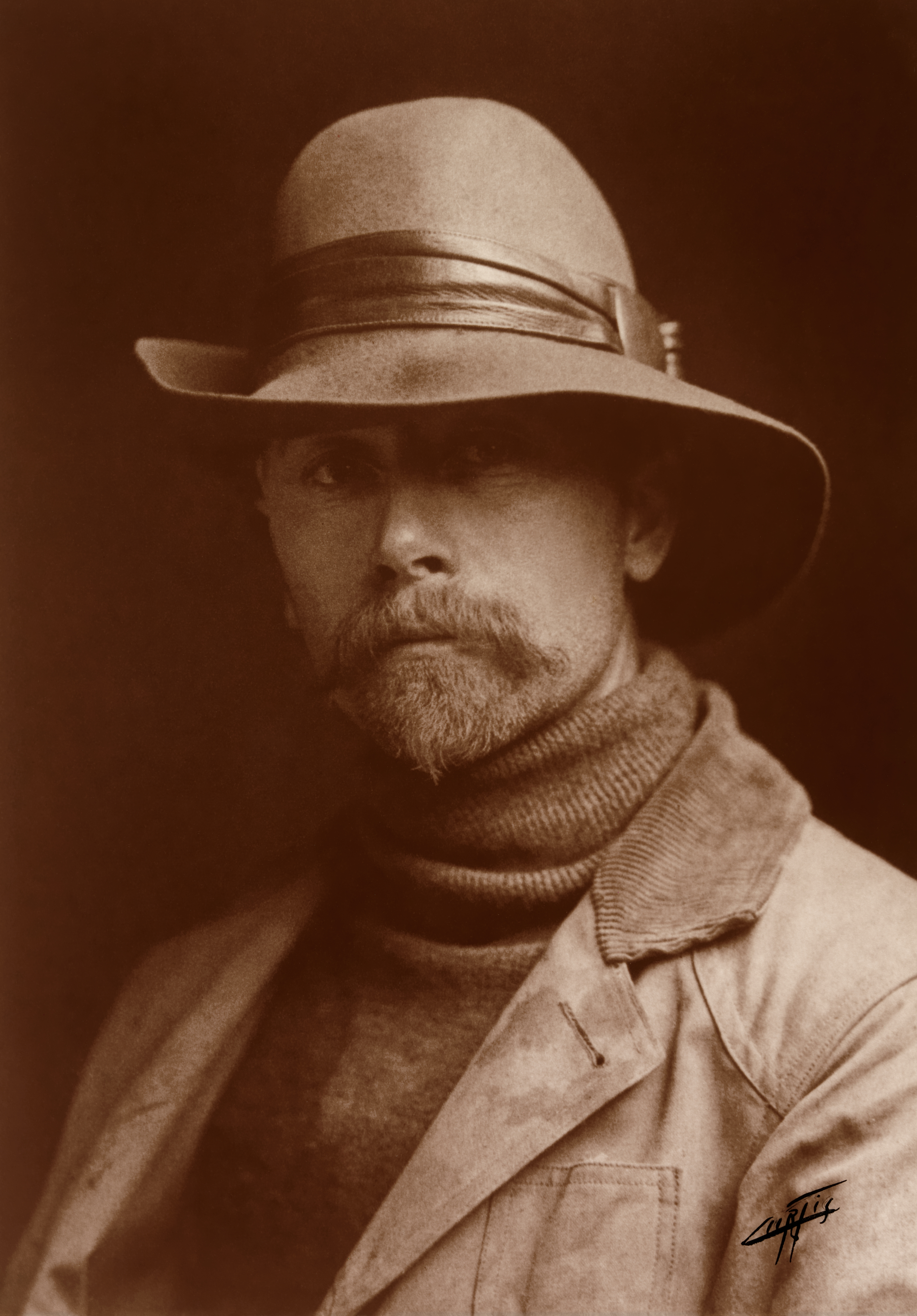
Edward S. Curtis (1899)

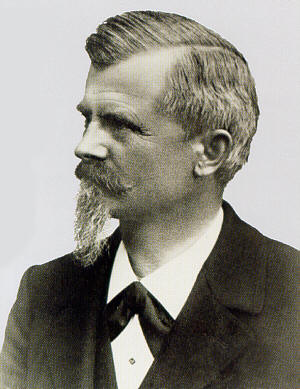
Wilhelm Maybach (1900)

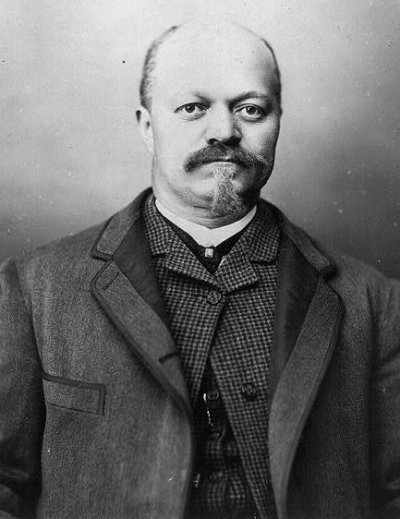
Warren Clay Coleman

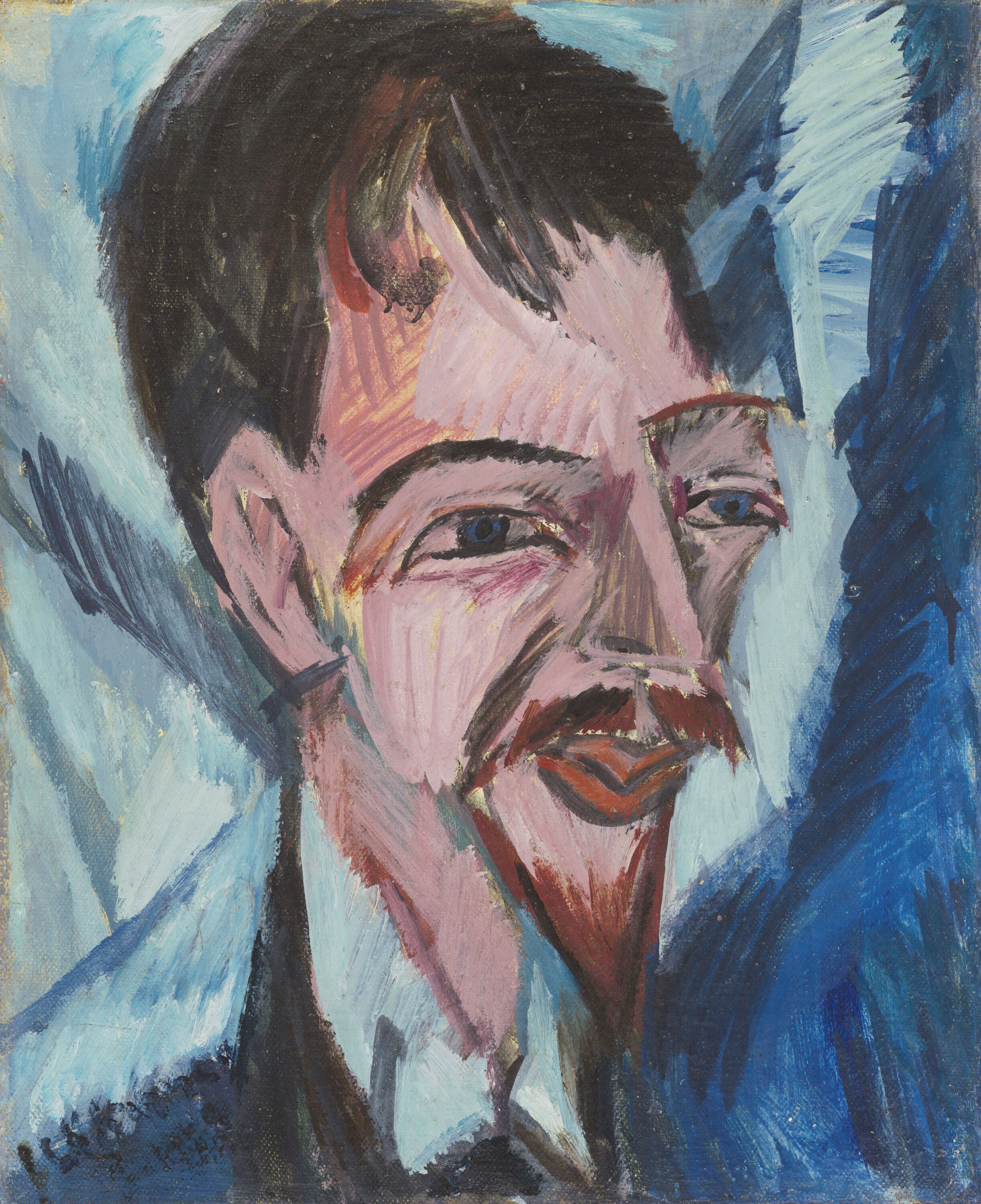
Alfred Döblin by Ernst Ludwig Kirchner (1912)

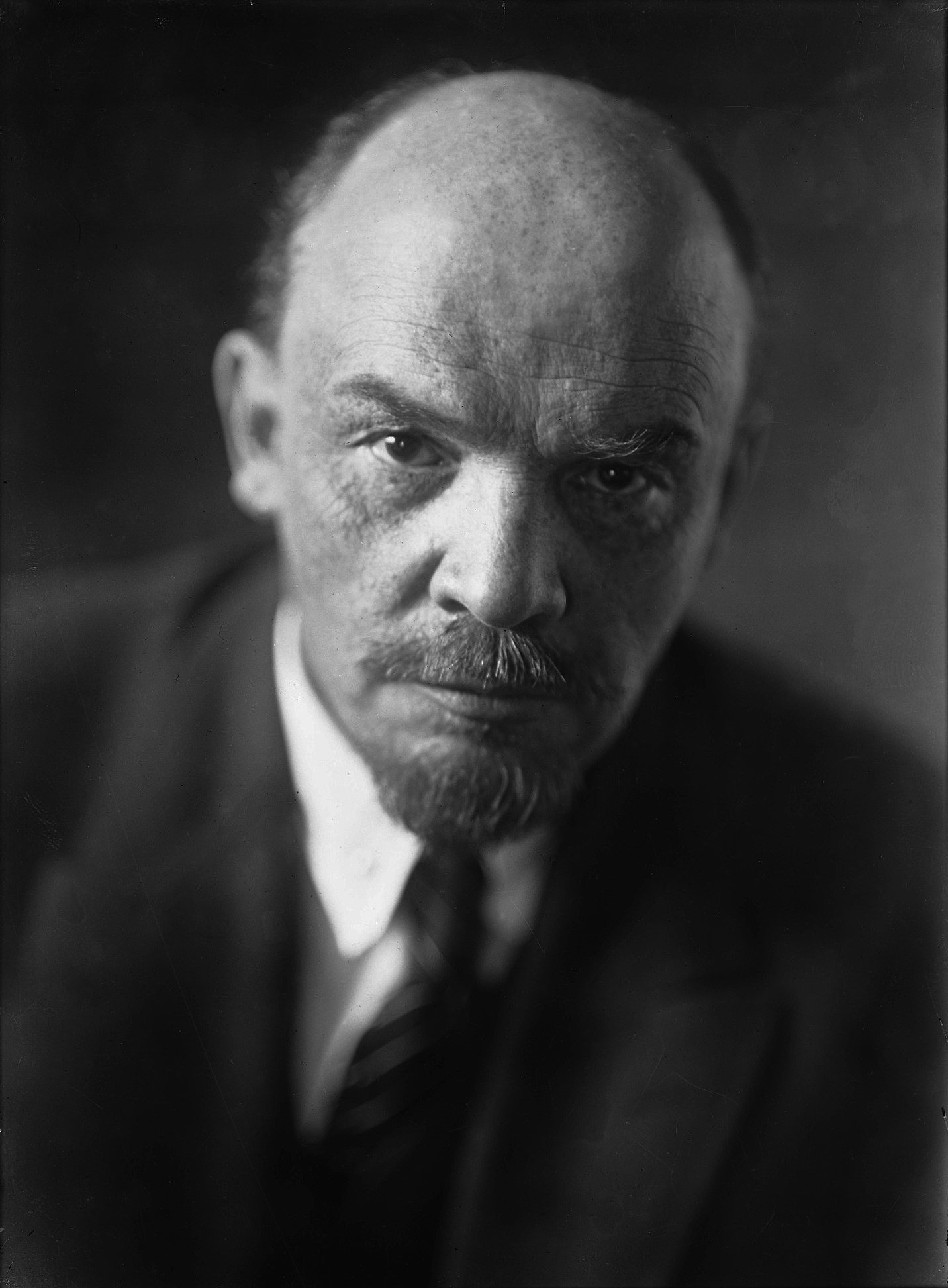
Vladimir Lenin (1920)

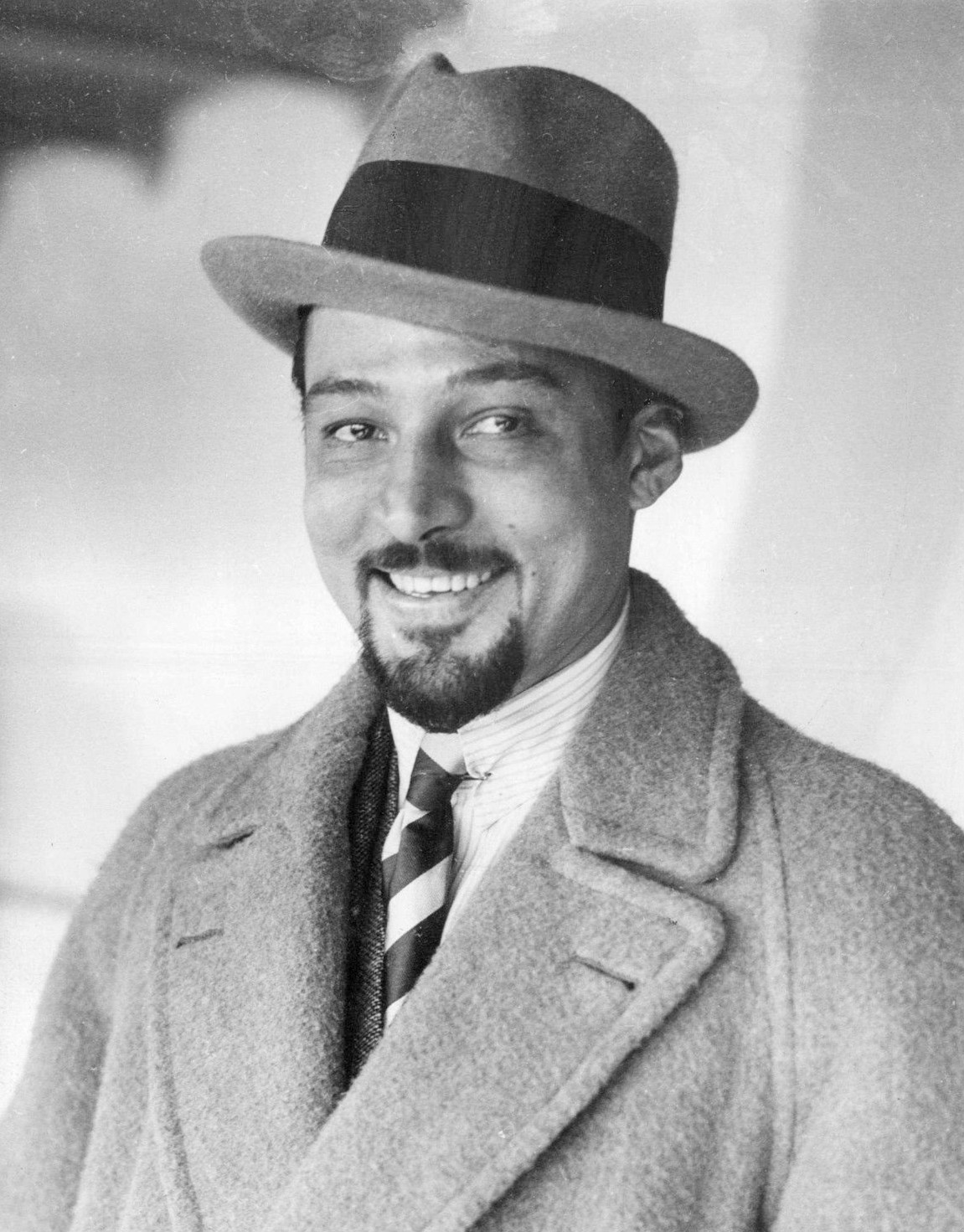
Rudolph Valentino (1924)

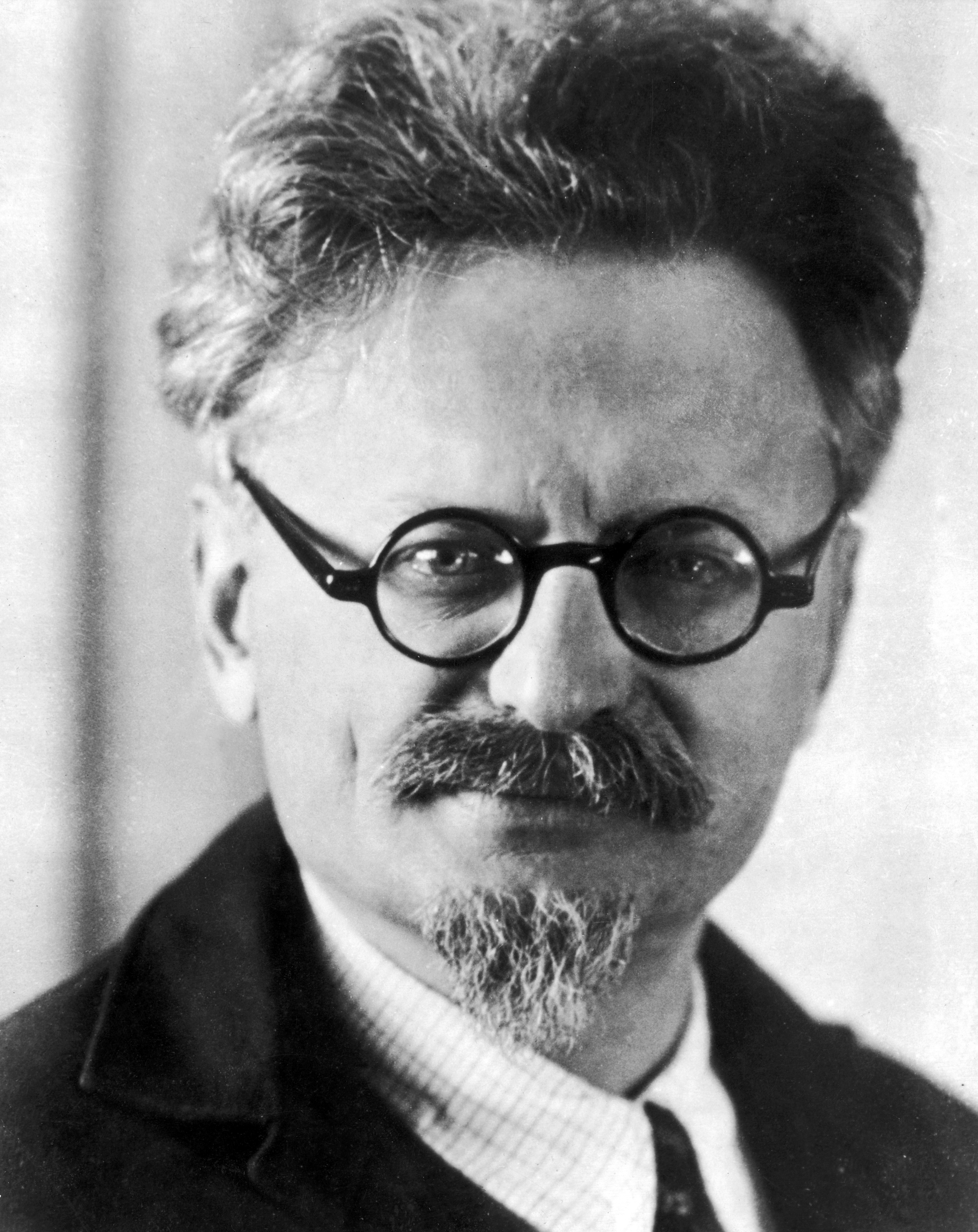
Leon Trotsky (1930s)

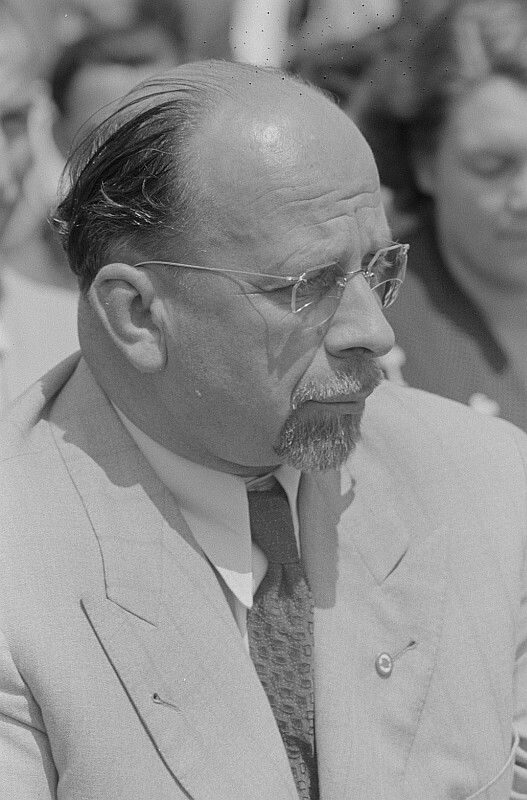
Walter Ulbricht (1951)

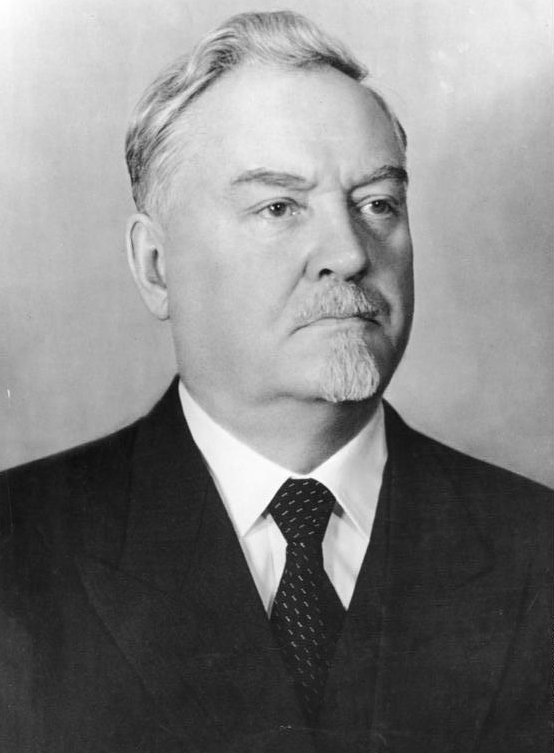
Nikolai Bulganin (1955)

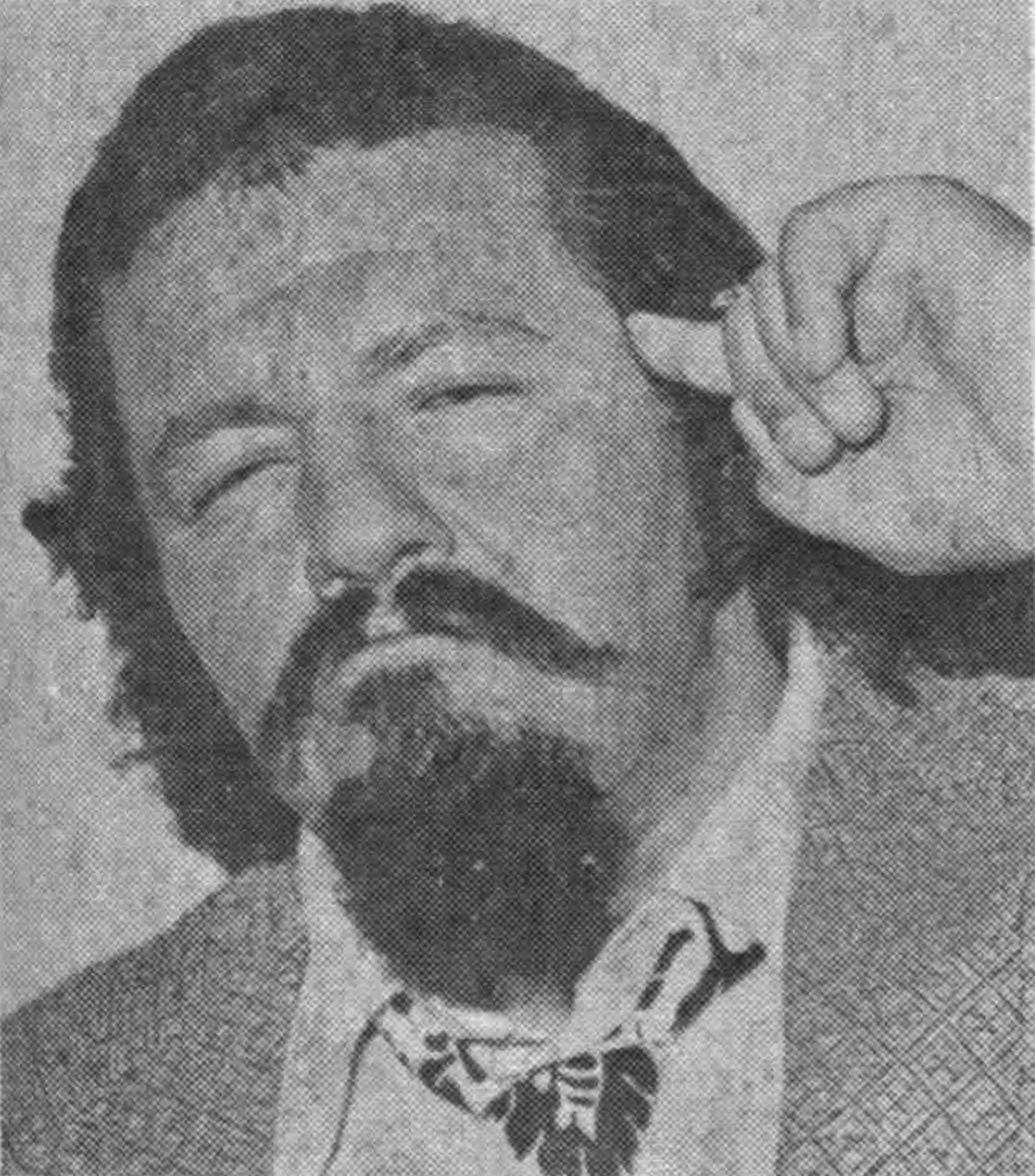
Lou Albano (1973)

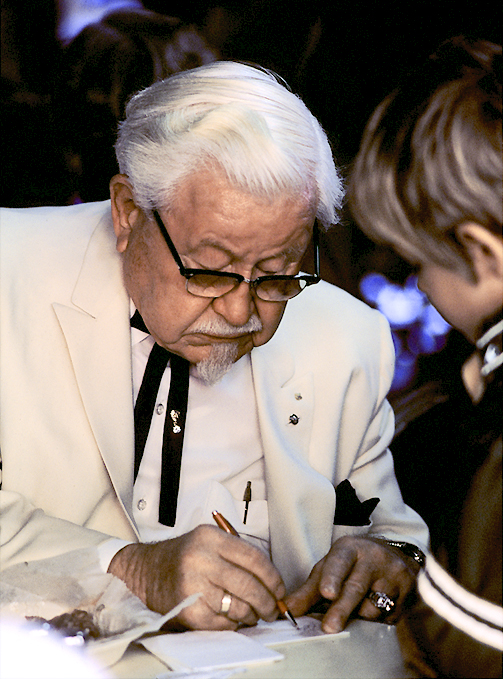
Colonel Sanders (c. 1974)

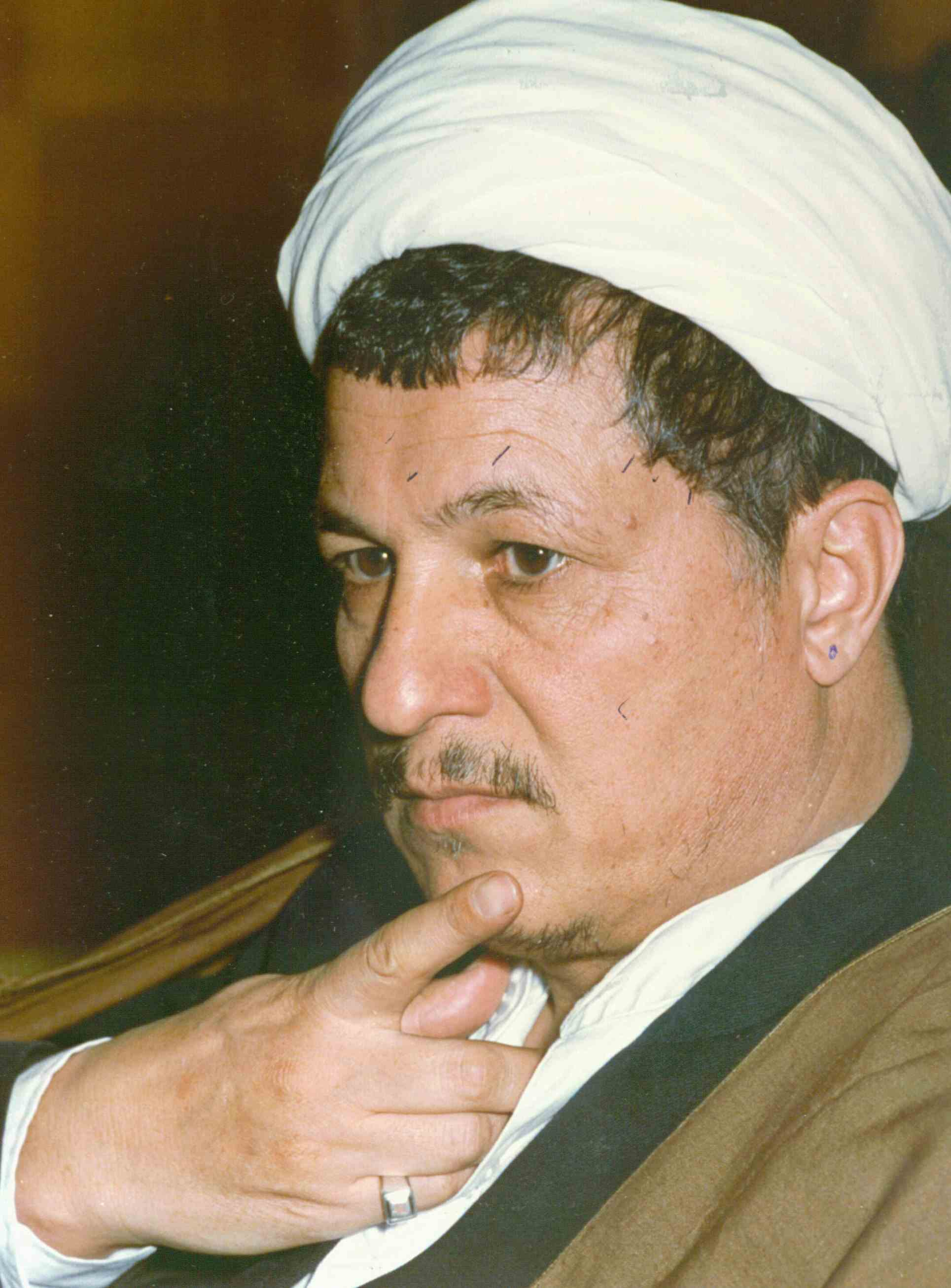
Akbar Hashemi Rafsanjani (1988)

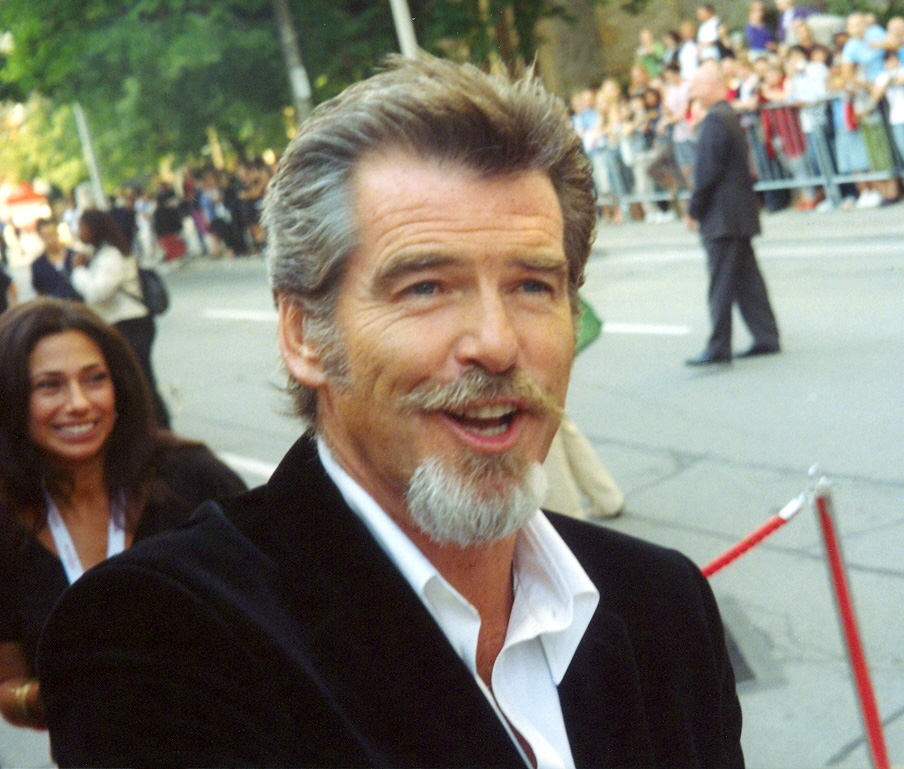
Pierce Brosnan (2005)

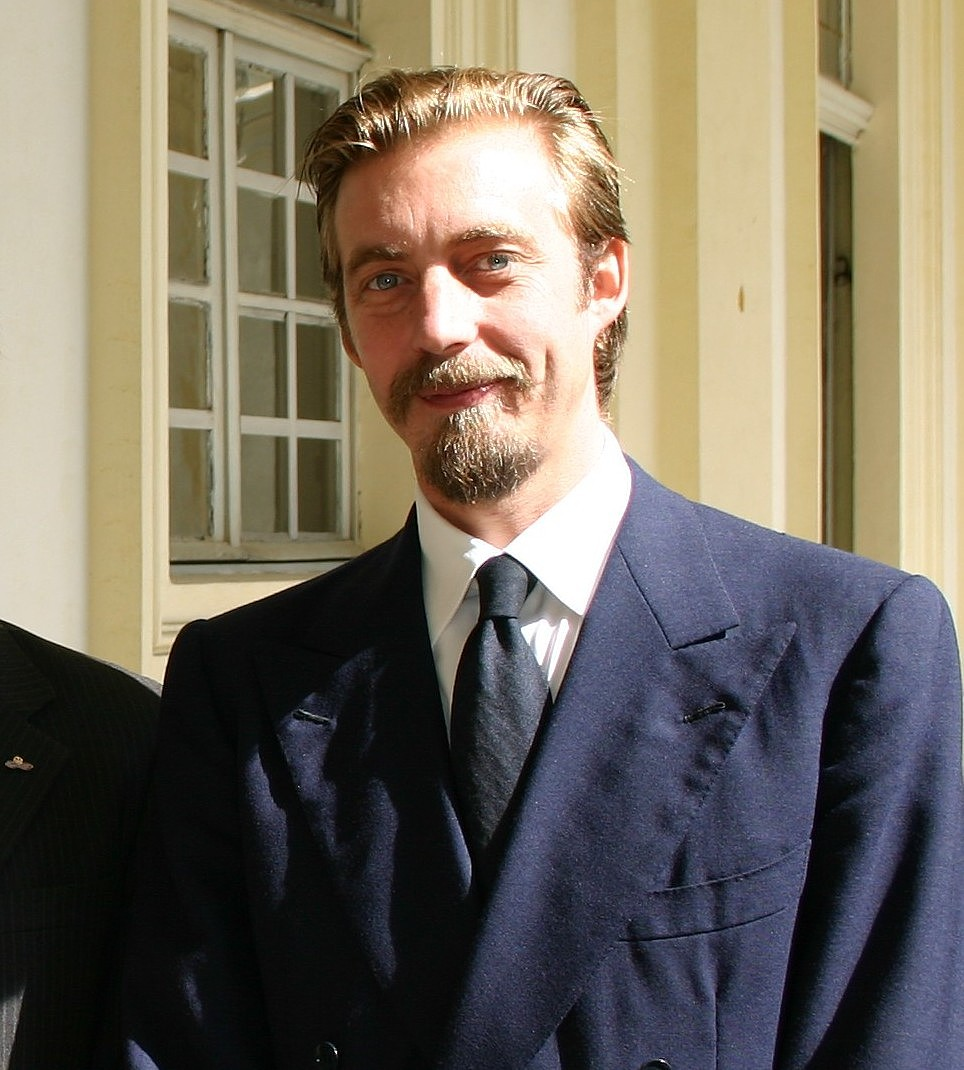
Prince Aimone, Duke of Apulia (2006)

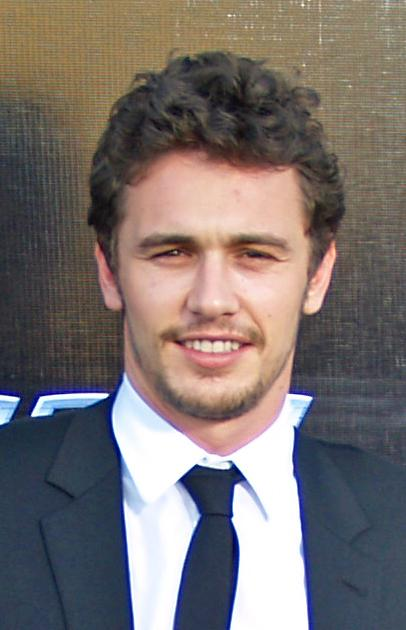
James Franco (2007)

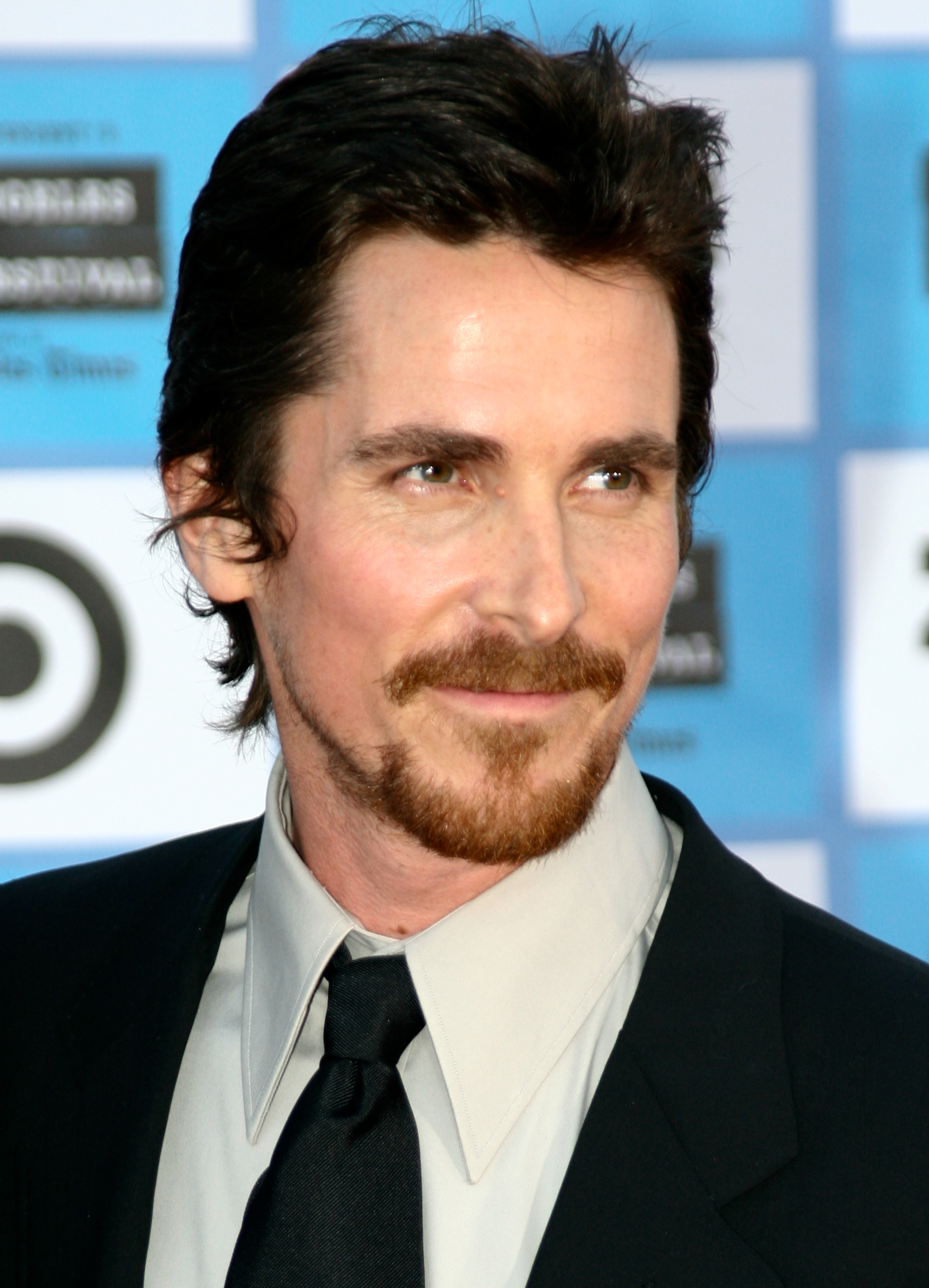
Christian Bale (2009)

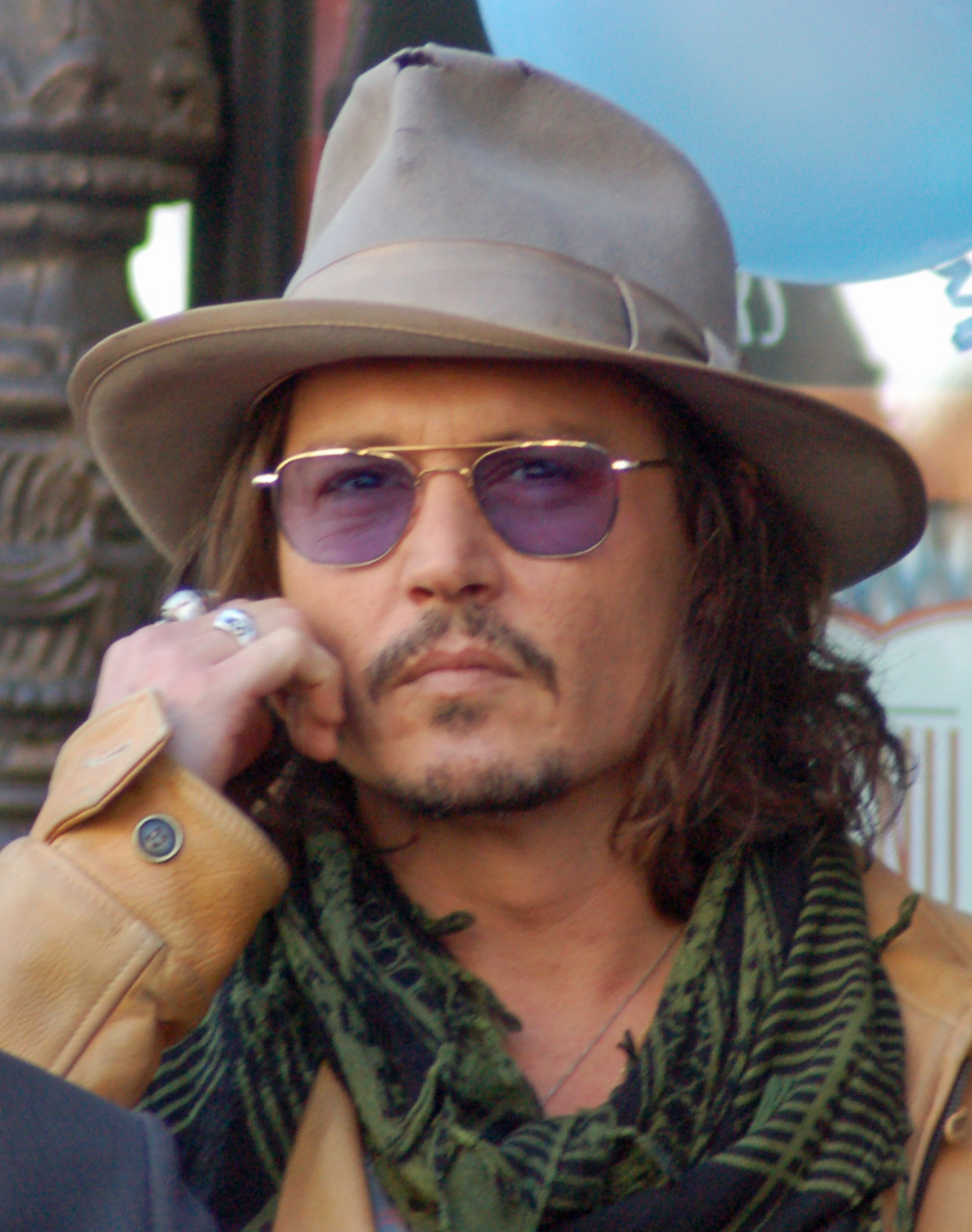
Johnny Depp (2011)

== See also ==
- List of facial hairstyles
