= Beard =

Hair on the chin, lower face and neck

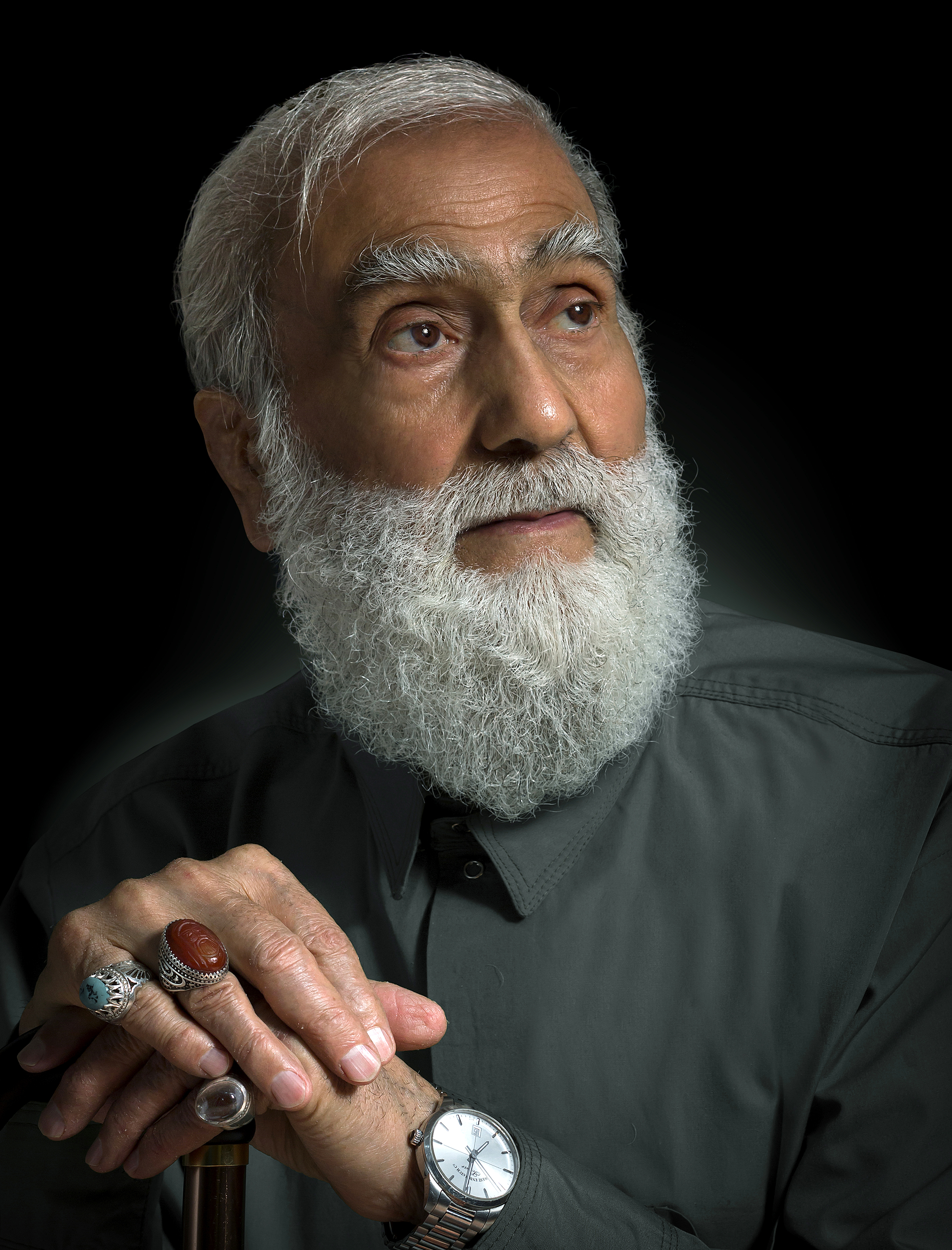
- A bearded man

Details

Identifiers
- Latin: barba
- TA98: A16.0.00.018
- TA2: 7058
- FMA: 54240

A beard is the hair that grows on the jaw, chin, upper lip, lower lip, cheeks, and neck of humans and some non-human animals. In humans, beards are most common among pubescent and adult males, though some women also develop them in a condition called hirsutism.

Attitudes toward beards have varied across history, shaped by cultural traditions and fashion trends. Several religions require or encourage the wearing of beards, and some societies have associated them with masculinity, virility, virtue, beauty, wisdom, strength, fertility, sexual prowess, and high social status. In contrast, in cultures where beards are uncommon or unfashionable, they may be linked with poor hygiene or eccentricity. Beards can also provide environmental benefits, including protection from cold weather and sun exposure.

== Biology ==
The beard develops in human males during puberty. Beard growth is linked to stimulation of hair follicles in the area by dihydrotestosterone, which continues to affect beard growth after puberty. Dihydrotestosterone also promotes balding. Dihydrotestosterone is produced from testosterone, the levels of which vary with season. Beard growth rate is also genetic.

=== Evolution ===
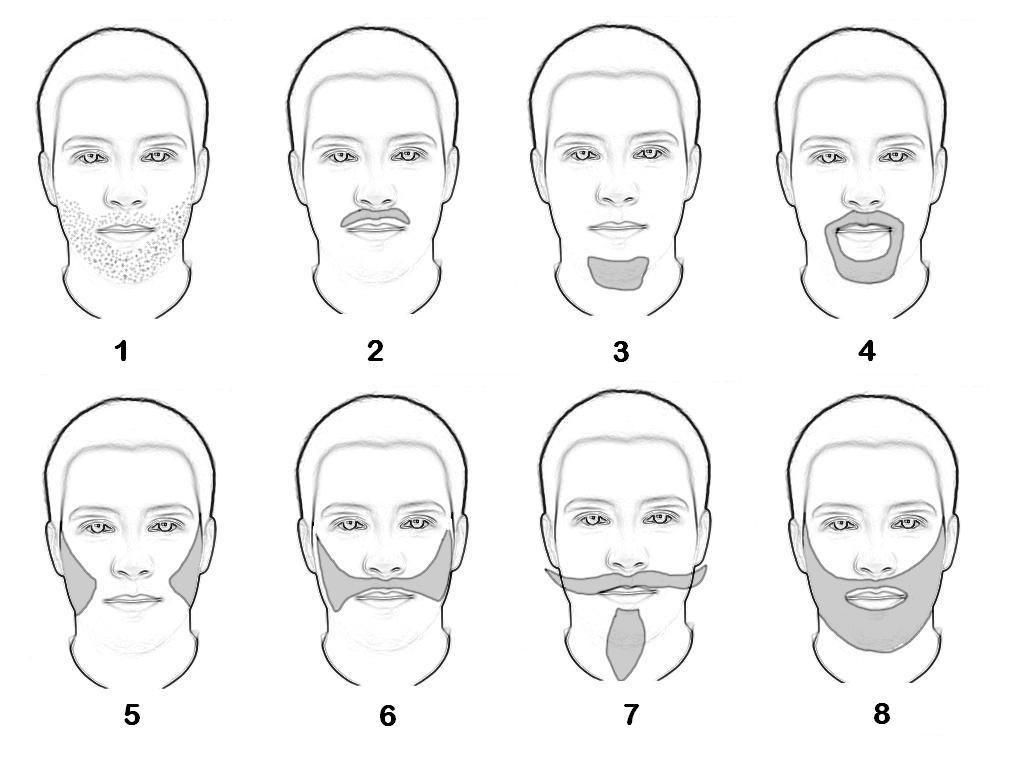
Different types of beards: 1) Incipient 2) Moustache 3) Goatee or Mandarin 4) Spanish-style 5) Long sideburns 6) Sideburns joined by a moustache 7) Style Van Dyke 8) Full beard.

Biologists characterize beards as a secondary sexual characteristic because they are (mostly) unique to one sex, yet do not play a direct role in reproduction. Charles Darwin first suggested a possible evolutionary explanation of beards in his work The Descent of Man, which hypothesized that the process of sexual selection may have led to beards. Modern biologists have reaffirmed the role of sexual selection in the evolution of beards.

Evolutionary psychology explanations for the existence of beards include signalling sexual maturity and signalling dominance by the increasing perceived size of jaws; clean-shaved faces are rated less dominant than bearded. Some scholars assert that it is not yet established whether the sexual selection leading to beards is rooted in attractiveness (inter-sexual selection) or dominance (intra-sexual selection). A beard can be explained as an indicator of a male's overall condition. The rate of facial hairiness appears to influence male attractiveness. The presence of a beard makes the male vulnerable in hand-to-hand fights (it provides an easy way to grab and hold the opponent's head), which is costly, so biologists have speculated that there must be other evolutionary benefits that outweigh that drawback. Excess testosterone evidenced by the beard may indicate mild immunosuppression, which may support spermatogenesis.

== History ==
=== Ancient and classical world ===
==== Phoenicia ====
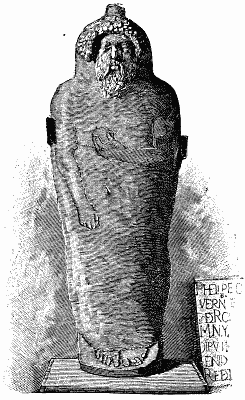
Phoenicians gave great attention to the beard, as can be seen in their sculptures.

Phoenicia, the ancient Semitic civilization centered on the coastline of the Eastern Mediterranean (modern-day Syria, Lebanon, Palestine, and Israel), gave great attention to the hair and beard. It was arranged in three, four, or five rows of small tight curls, and extended from ear to ear around the cheeks and chin. Sometimes, however, in lieu of the many rows, we find one row only, the beard falling in tresses curled at the extremity.

==== Israelites ====
Israelite society placed a special importance on the beard. Many male religious figures mentioned in the Tanakh are recorded to have had facial hair. According to biblical scholars, the shaving of hair, particularly of the corners of the beard, was a mourning custom. The religious cultivation of beards by Israelites may have been done as a deliberate attempt to distinguish their behaviour in comparison to their neighbours, reducing the impact of foreign customs (and religion) as a result. The Hittites and Elamites were clean-shaven, and the Sumerians were also frequently without a beard; conversely, the Egyptians and Libyans shaved the beard into very stylised elongated goatees.

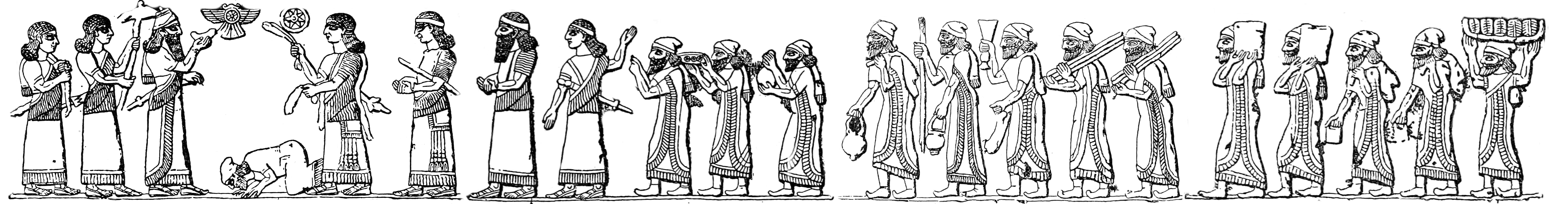
The Israelite king Jehu kneels before Shalmaneser III as carved on the Black Obelisk. He and the Israelite delegation are distinguished from the Assyrians by distinctive beards.

==== Mesopotamia ====
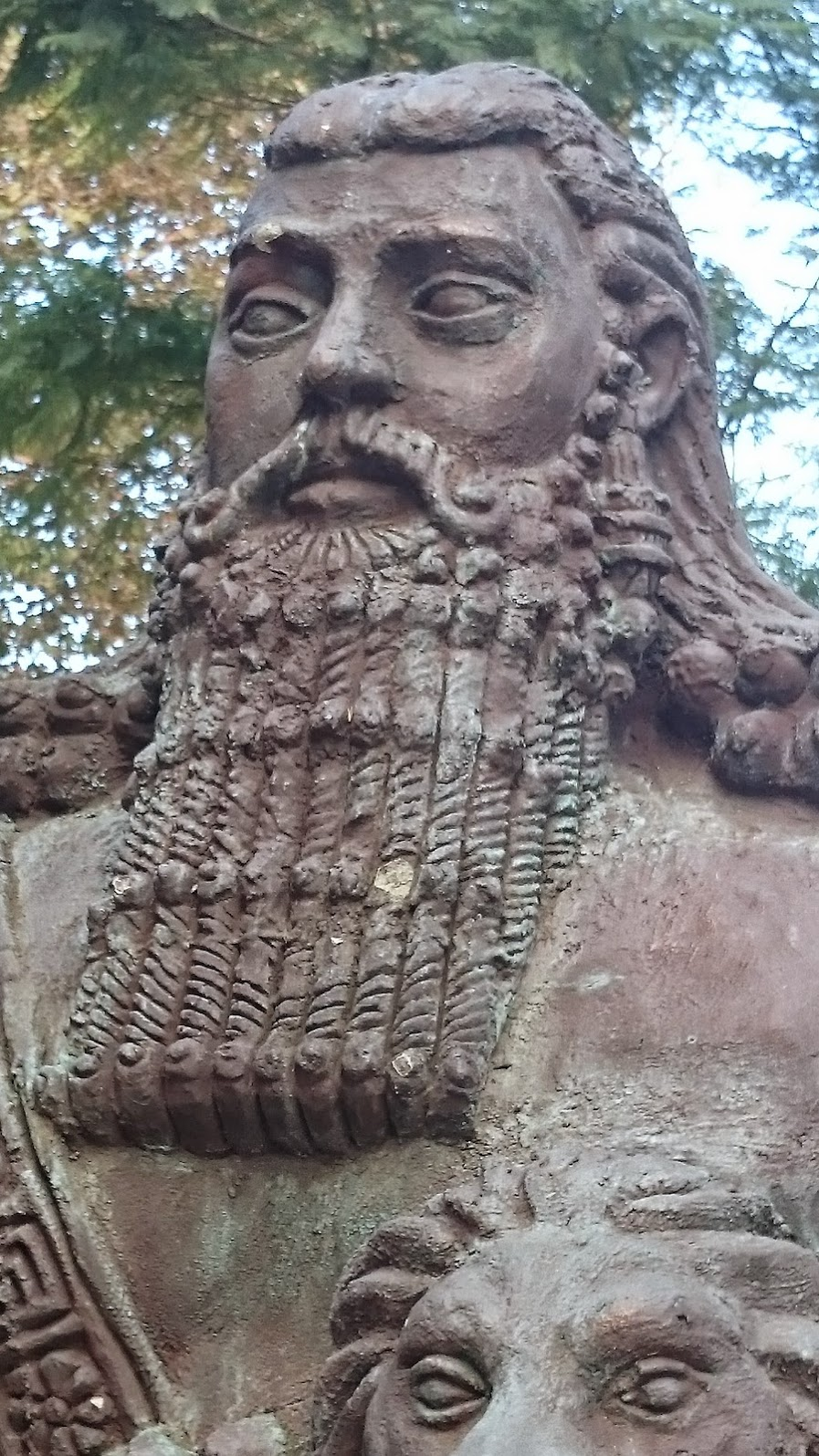
Statue of Gilgamesh with elaborate beard

Mesopotamian civilizations (Sumerian, Assyrians, Babylonians, Chaldeans) devoted great care to oiling and dressing their beards, using tongs and curling irons to create elaborate ringlets and tiered patterns.

==== Egypt ====
While generally ancient Egyptian fashion called for men to be clean-shaven, during at least some periods the highest ranking Ancient Egyptians grew hair on their chins which was often dyed a reddish orange with henna and sometimes plaited with an interwoven gold thread. A metal false beard, or postiche, which was a sign of sovereignty, was worn by kings and by queens regnant. This was held in place by a ribbon tied over the head and attached to a gold chin strap, a fashion existing from about 3000 to 1580 BCE.

==== Greece ====
Aristotle with a beard

The ancient Greeks regarded the beard as a badge or sign of virility; in the Homeric epics it had almost sanctified significance, so that a common form of entreaty was to touch the beard of the person addressed. According to William Smith in these ancient times the moustache was shaven, leaving clear the space around the lips. The beard was only shaven as a sign of mourning, though in this case it was instead often left untrimmed. A smooth face was regarded as a sign of effeminacy. The Spartans punished cowards by shaving off a portion of their beards. Greek beards were also frequently curled with tongs. Youngsters usually did not grow a beard; moreover wearing a beard became optional for adults in the 5th and 4th century BCE.

==== Rome ====
Shaving seems to have not been known to the Romans during their early history (under the kings of Rome and the early Republic). Pliny tells us that P. Ticinius was the first who brought a barber to Rome, which was in the 454th year from the founding of the city (that is, around 299 BCE). Scipio Africanus (236–183 BCE) was apparently the first among the Romans who shaved his beard. However, after that point, shaving seems to have caught on very quickly, and soon almost all Roman men were clean-shaven; being clean-shaven became a sign of being Roman and not Greek. Only in the later times of the Republic did the Roman youth begin shaving their beards only partially, trimming it into an ornamental form; prepubescent boys oiled their chins in hopes of forcing premature growth of a beard.

Still, beards remained rare among the Romans throughout the Late Republic and the early Principate. In Rome at this time, a long beard was considered a mark of slovenliness and squalor. The censors L. Veturius and P. Licinius compelled M. Livius, who had been banished, on his restoration to the city, to be shaved, to lay aside his dirty appearance, and then, but not until then, to come into the Senate. The first occasion of shaving was regarded as the beginning of manhood, and the day on which this took place was celebrated as a festival. Usually, this was done when the young Roman assumed the toga virilis. Augustus did it in his twenty-fourth year, Caligula in his twentieth. The hair cut off on such occasions was consecrated to a god. Thus Nero put his into a golden box set with pearls, and dedicated it to Jupiter Capitolinus. The Romans, unlike the Greeks, let their beards grow in time of mourning; so did Augustus for the death of Julius Caesar. Other occasions of mourning on which the beard was allowed to grow were appearance as a reus, condemnation, or some public calamity. On the other hand, men of the country areas around Rome in the time of Varro seem not to have shaved except when they came to market every eighth day, so that their usual appearance was most likely a short stubble.

In the second century CE the Emperor Hadrian (r. 117–138), according to Dio Cassius, was the first emperor to grow a full beard; Plutarch says that he did it to hide scars on his face. This was a period in Rome of widespread imitation of Greek culture, and many other men grew beards in imitation of Hadrian and the Greek fashion. After Hadrian until the reign of Constantine the Great (r. 306–337) all adult emperors appear in busts and coins with beards; but Constantine and his successors until the reign of Phocas (r. 602–610), with the exception of Julian the Apostate (r. 361–363), are represented as beardless. The wearing of the beard as an imperial fashion was subsequently revived by Phocas at the beginning of the 7th century and this fashion lasted until the end of the Byzantine Empire.

==== The "philosopher's beard" ====
In Greco-Roman antiquity the beard was "seen as the defining characteristic of the philosopher; philosophers had to have beards, and anyone with a beard was assumed to be a philosopher." While one may be tempted to think that Socrates and Plato sported "philosopher's beards", such is not the case. Shaving was not widespread in Athens during fifth and fourth-century BCE and so they would not be distinguished from the general populace for having a beard. The popularity of shaving did not rise in the region until the example of Alexander the Great near the end of the fourth century BCE. The popularity of shaving did not spread to Rome until the end of the third century BCE following its acceptance by Scipio Africanus. In Rome shaving's popularity grew to the point that for a respectable Roman citizen, it was seen almost as compulsory.

The idea of the philosopher's beard gained traction when in 155 BCE three philosophers arrived in Rome as Greek diplomats: Carneades, head of the Platonic Academy; Critolaus of Aristotle's Lyceum; and the head of the Stoics, Diogenes of Babylon. "In contrast to their beautifully clean-shaven Italian audience, these three intellectuals all sported magnificent beards." Thus the connection of beards and philosophy caught hold of the Roman public imagination.

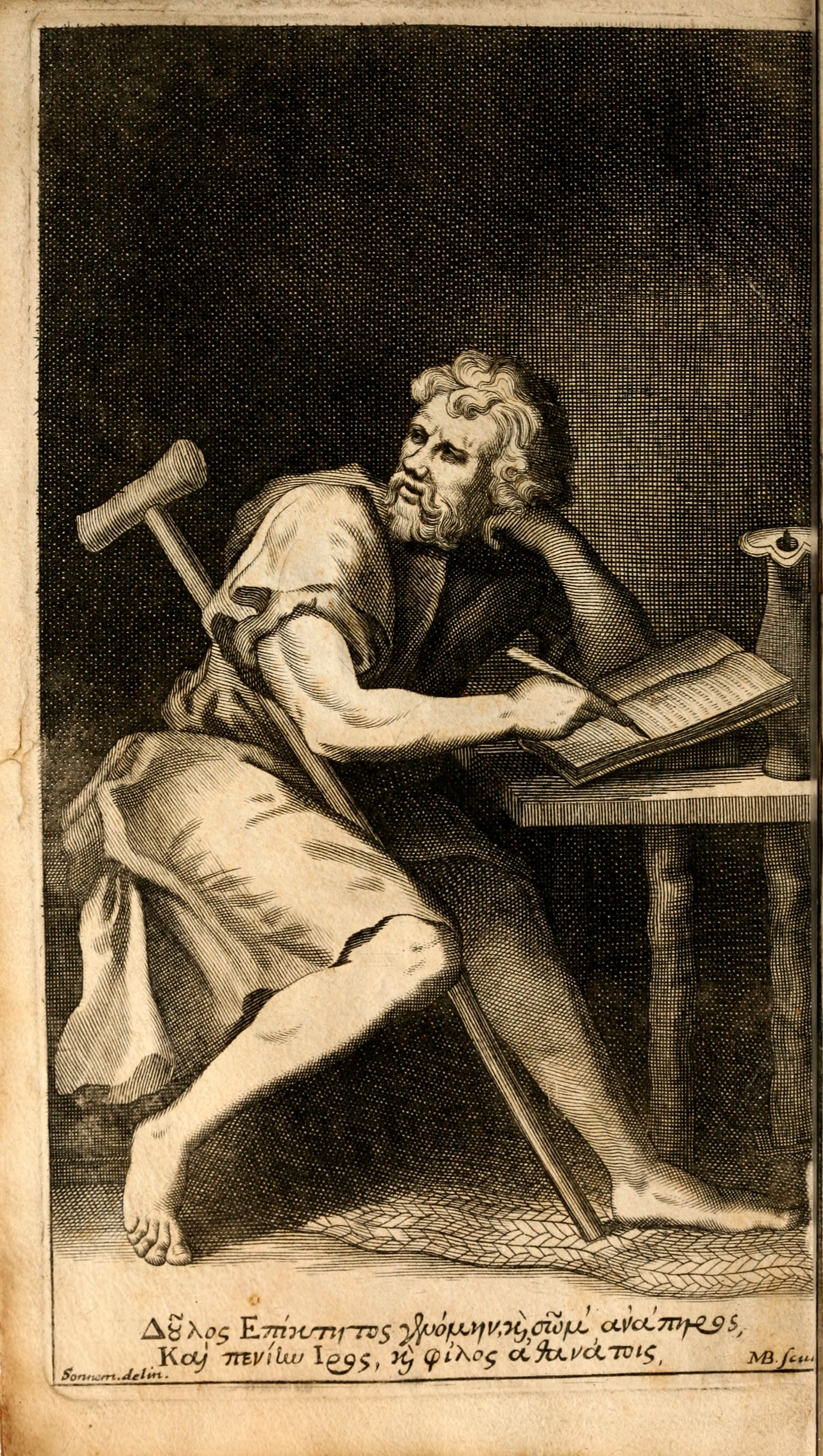
Epictetus stated he would embrace death before shaving.

The importance of the beard to Roman philosophers is best seen by the extreme value that the Stoic philosopher Epictetus placed on it. As historian John Sellars puts it, Epictetus "affirmed the philosopher's beard as something almost sacred...to express the idea that philosophy is no mere intellectual hobby but rather a way of life that, by definition, transforms every aspect of one's behavior, including one's shaving habits. If someone continues to shave in order to look the part of a respectable Roman citizen, it is clear that they have not yet embraced philosophy conceived as a way of life and have not yet escaped the social customs of the majority...the true philosopher will only act according to reason or according to nature, rejecting the arbitrary conventions that guide the behavior of everyone else."

Epictetus saw his beard as an integral part of his identity and held that he would rather be executed than submit to any force demanding he remove it. In his Discourses 1.2.29, he puts forward such a hypothetical confrontation: "'Come now, Epictetus, shave your beard'. If I am a philosopher, I answer, I will not shave it off. 'Then I will have you beheaded'. If it will do you any good, behead me." The act of shaving "would be to compromise his philosophical ideal of living in accordance with nature and it would be to submit to the unjustified authority of another."

This was not theoretical in the age of Epictetus, for the Emperor Domitian had the hair and beard forcibly shaven off of the philosopher Apollonius of Tyana "as punishment for anti-State activities." This disgraced Apollonius while avoiding making him a martyr like Socrates. Well before his declaration of "death before shaving" Epictetus had been forced to flee Rome when Domitian banished all philosophers from Italy under threat of execution.

Roman philosophers sported different styles of beards to distinguish which school they belonged to. Cynics used long dirty beards to indicate their "strict indifference to all external goods and social customs.” Stoics occasionally trimmed and washed their beards in accordance with their view "that it is acceptable to prefer certain external goods so long as they are never valued above virtue.” Peripatetics took great care of their beards believing in accordance with Aristotle that "external goods and social status were necessary for the good life together with virtue". To a Roman philosopher in this era, having a beard and its condition indicated their commitment to live in accordance with their philosophy.

==== Celts and Germanic tribes ====
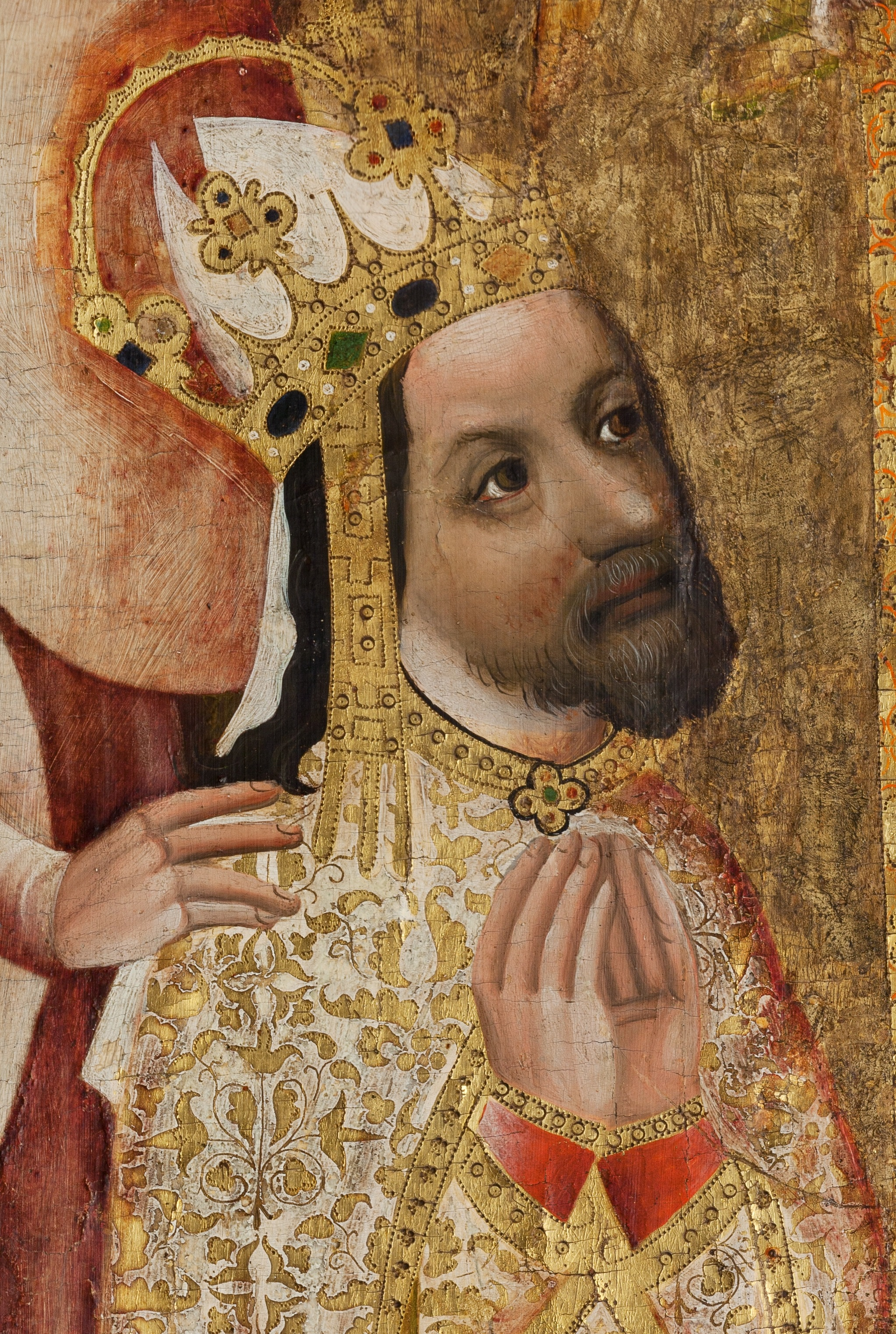
Charles IV, Holy Roman Emperor

Late Hellenistic sculptures of Celts portray them with long hair and mustaches but beardless. Caesar reported the Britons wore no beard except upon the upper lip.

The Anglo-Saxons on arrival in Great Britain wore beards and continued to do so for a considerable time after. Among the Gaelic Celts of Scotland and Ireland, men typically let their facial hair grow into a full beard, and it was often seen as dishonourable for a Gaelic man to have no facial hair.

Tacitus states that among the Catti, a Germanic tribe (perhaps the Chatten), a young man was not allowed to shave or cut his hair until he had slain an enemy. The Lombards derived their name from the great length of their beards (Longobards – Long Beards). When Otto the Great said anything serious, he swore by his beard, which covered his breast.

=== Middle Ages ===
In Medieval Europe, a beard displayed a knight's virility and honour. The Castilian knight El Cid is described in The Lay of the Cid as "the one with the flowery beard". Holding somebody else's beard was a serious offence that had to be righted in a duel. The punishment for pulling off someone else's beard was the same as for castrating him.

While most noblemen and knights were bearded, the Catholic clergy were generally required to be clean. This was understood as a symbol of their celibacy.

The prevalence of facial hair amongst the elites and nobles of Western Europe would wax and wane periodically throughout the Middle Ages but would remain relatively common throughout until during the Late Middle Ages when, likely influenced by the emerging Renaissance, most European nobles would be clean-shaven.

In pre-Islamic Arabia, Arabian men would apparently shorten their beards and keep big mustachios. Muhammad encouraged his followers to do the opposite, to grow their beards and trim their moustaches, to differ with the non-believers. This style of beard subsequently spread along with Islam during the Muslim expansion in the Middle Ages.

=== From the Renaissance to the present day ===
Most Chinese emperors of the Ming dynasty (1368–1644) appear with beards or mustaches in portraits.

In the 15th century, most European men in both the church and the nobility were clean-shaven. In the 16th-century beards became fashionable again, particularly following the Reformation where many rulers, nobles and religious reformers grew long beards to distinguish themselves from the usually clean shaven Catholic clergy. This was such that by the mid-16th century most Catholic clergy had also adopted beards. Every pope from Clement VII (pope 1523–1534) to Innocent XII (pope 1691–1700) would also sport facial hair. Some other beards of this time were the Spanish spade beard, the English square cut beard, the forked beard, and the stiletto beard. In 1587 Francis Drake claimed, in a figure of speech, to have singed the King of Spain's beard. This trend can be recognised during this period for example amongst monarchs of leading European countries, where the shift can be seen between clean-shaven Holy Roman Emperor Maximilian I as well as King of Aragon Ferdinand II of Aragon and their bearded successor Charles V, clean-shaven King of England Henry VII and his bearded successor Henry VIII and clean-shaven King of France Louis XII and his bearded successor Francis I.

During the Chinese Qing dynasty (1644–1911), the ruling Manchu minority were either clean-shaven or at most wore mustaches, in contrast to the Han majority who still wore beards in keeping with the Confucian ideal.

In the beginning of the 17th century, the size of beards decreased in urban circles of Western Europe with shapes becoming more trimmed and pointed. By the middle of the century men usually wore a mustache or a pointed goatee. In the latter half of the century, influenced in part by the trends and fashions emerging from the French royal court, shaving became more and more common again amongst the nobities and upper classes, so much so that in 1698 Peter the Great of Russia ordered men to shave off their beards, and in 1705 levied a tax on beards in order to bring Russian society more in line with contemporary Western Europe. Throughout the 18th century virtually all upper class and middle class European men would be clean shaven. Shaving would become a marker of the 'educated', 'sophisticated' and 'enlightened' gentleman of the time.

At the end of the 18th century, after the French Revolution, attitudes began to turn away from the upper-class fashions of the previous century, particularly amongst the lower orders. At the turn of the century most upper and middle class men remained clean-shaven. However, the shift in fashions that began during the revolutionary period would influence the middle and later the upper classes across Europe and this included the gradual return of facial hair. This is seen in the 1810s and 1820s with many men adopting sideburns or side whiskers which would become more elaborate in ensuing decades. The period also saw many men serving in Western armies adopting the 'regimental mustache' which became a common association with the soldiers of the time.

This was followed by a dramatic shift in the beard's popularity following the Revolutions of 1848, with it becoming markedly more popular. Consequently, beards were adopted by many monarchs, such as Franz Joseph I of Austria (r. 1848 – 1916), Napoleon III of France (r. 1852 – 1870), Alexander II of Russia (r. 1855 – 1881), and William I of Germany (r. 1861 – 1888), as well as many leading statesmen and cultural figures, such as Benjamin Disraeli, Charles Dickens, Giuseppe Garibaldi, Karl Marx, and Giuseppe Verdi. This trend can be also recognised in the United States, where the shift can be seen amongst the presidents during and after the Civil War in the period of 1861 – 1913. Before Abraham Lincoln, no President had a beard; after Lincoln until William Howard Taft, every President except Andrew Johnson and William McKinley had either a beard or a moustache. Since 1913, when Woodrow Wilson became president, all presidents have been clean-shaven to the present day.

The beard became linked in this period with notions of masculinity and male courage. The resulting popularity has contributed to the stereotypical Victorian male figure in the popular mind, the stern figure clothed in black whose gravitas is added to by a heavy beard.

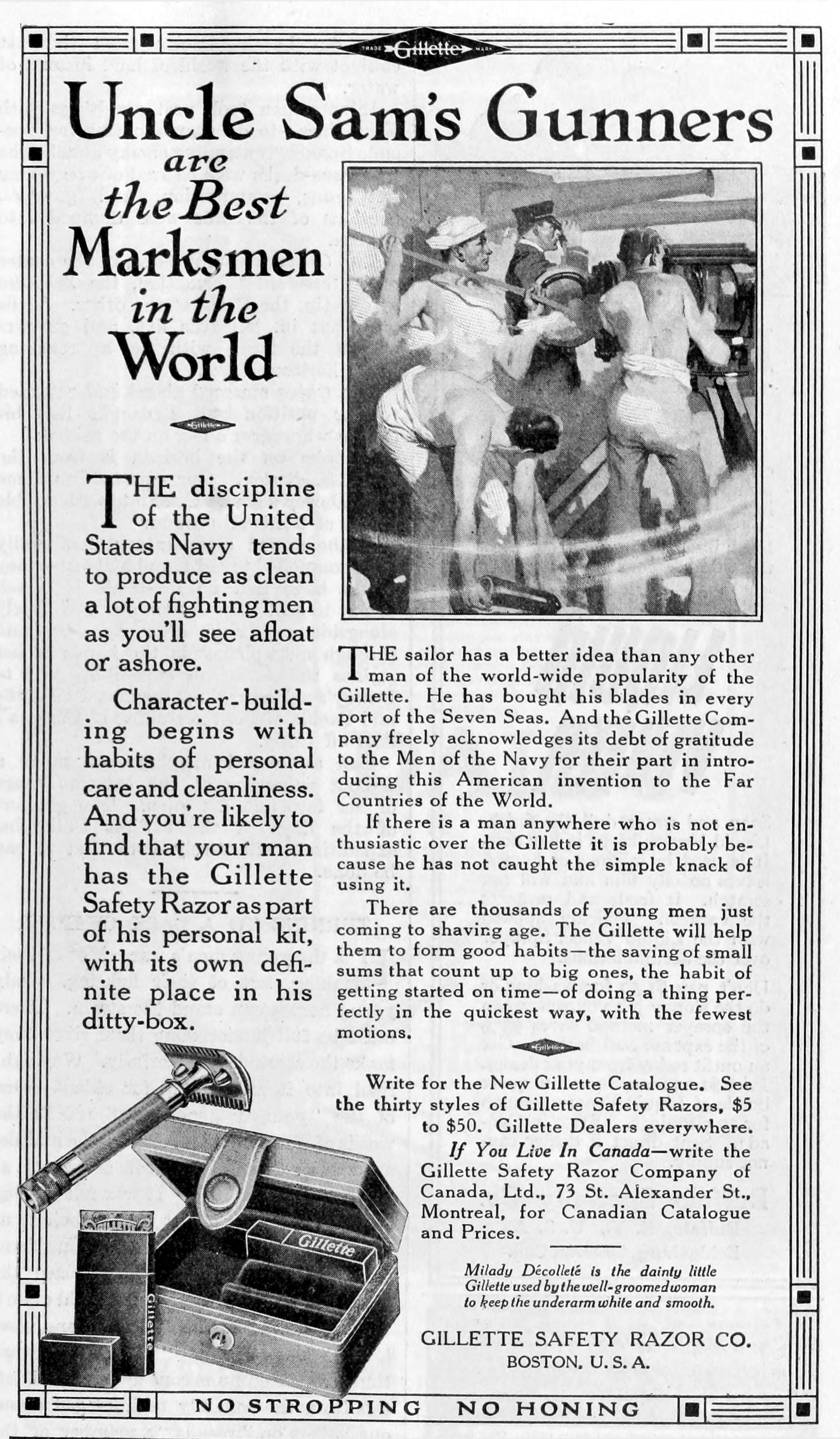
Gillette advert in the Literary Digest, 9 June 1917

In China, the revolution of 1911 and subsequent May Fourth Movement of 1919 led the Chinese to view the West as more modern and progressive than themselves. This included the realm of fashion, and Chinese men began shaving their faces and cutting their hair short.

By the early-twentieth century, beards began a slow decline in popularity. Although retained by some prominent figures who were young men in the Victorian period (like Sigmund Freud), most men who retained facial hair during the 1920s and 1930s limited themselves to a moustache or a goatee (such as with Marcel Proust, Albert Einstein, Vladimir Lenin, Leon Trotsky, Adolf Hitler, and Joseph Stalin). In the United States, meanwhile, popular movies portrayed heroes with clean-shaven faces and "crew cuts". Concurrently, the psychological mass marketing of Edward Bernays and Madison Avenue was becoming prevalent. The Gillette Safety Razor Company was one of these marketers' early clients. The phrase five o'clock shadow, as a pejorative for stubble, was coined circa 1942 in advertising for Gem Blades, by the American Safety Razor Company, and entered popular usage. These events conspired to popularize short hair and clean-shaven faces as the only acceptable style for decades to come. The few men who wore the beard or portions of the beard during this period were usually either old, Central European, members of a religious sect that required it, or in academia. This case of affairs would last all the way until the late-1960s.

The beard was reintroduced to mainstream society by the counterculture, firstly with the "beatniks" in the 1950s, and then with the hippie movement of the mid-1960s. Following the Vietnam War, facial hair exploded in popularity. In the mid-late 1960s and throughout the 1970s, beards were worn by hippies and businessmen alike. Popular musicians like The Beatles, Barry White, The Beach Boys, Jim Morrison (lead singer of The Doors) and the male members of Peter, Paul, and Mary, among many others, wore full beards or mustaches. The trend of seemingly ubiquitous facial hair in American culture subsided by the early-1980s, as political conservatism became dominant.

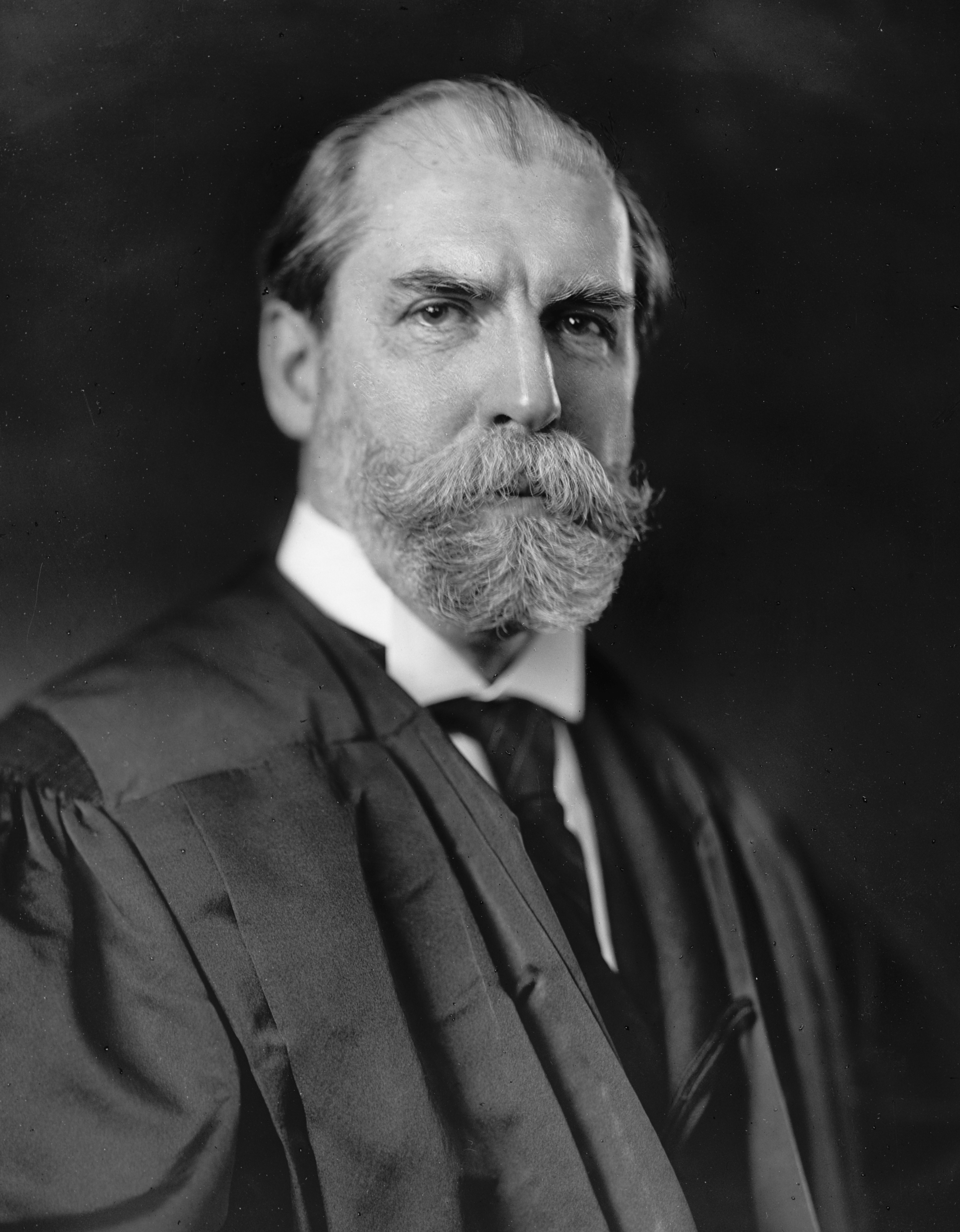
Charles Evans Hughes, 11th Chief Justice of the United States from 1930 to 1941

By the end of the 20th century, the closely clipped Verdi beard, often with a matching integrated moustache, had become relatively common. From the 1990s onward, fashion in the United States has generally trended toward either a goatee, Van Dyke, or a closely cropped full beard undercut on the throat. However, clean-shaven remained the most common style overall, in part due to successful advertising campaigns of Gillette. In 2010, the fashionable length approached a "two-day shadow". The 2010s decade also saw the full beard become fashionable again amongst young hipster men and a huge increase in the sales of male grooming products.

Members of the United States government have notably been historically clean-shaven. The last President to wear any type of facial hair was William Howard Taft (1909–13).

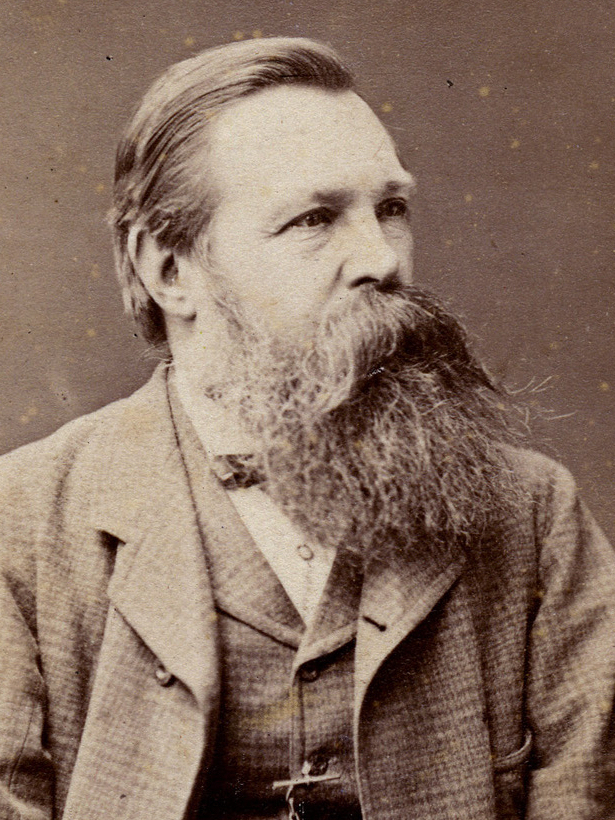
Friedrich Engels exhibiting a full moustache and beard that was a common style among Europeans of the 19th century

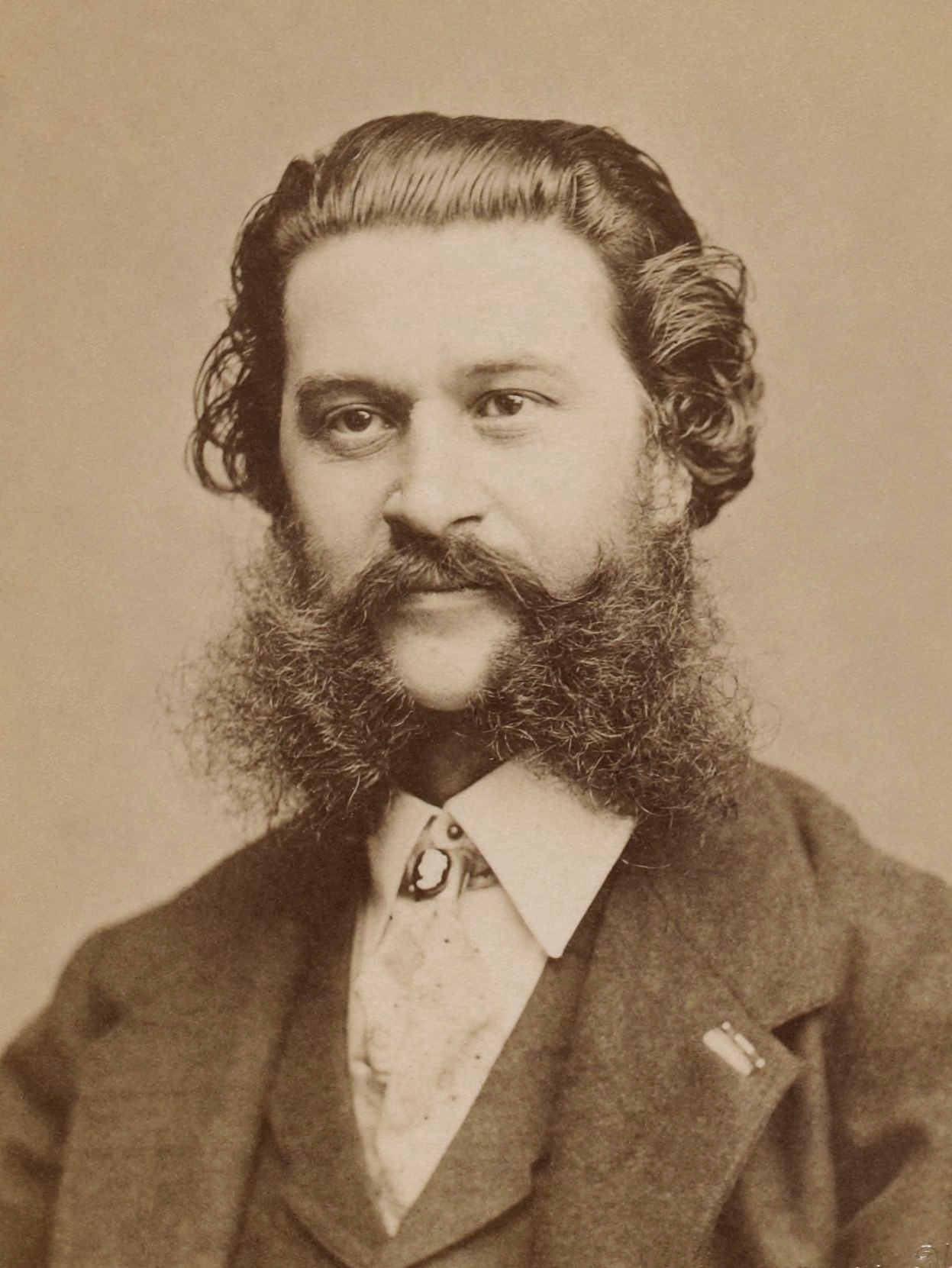
Johann Strauss II with a large beard, moustache, and sideburns

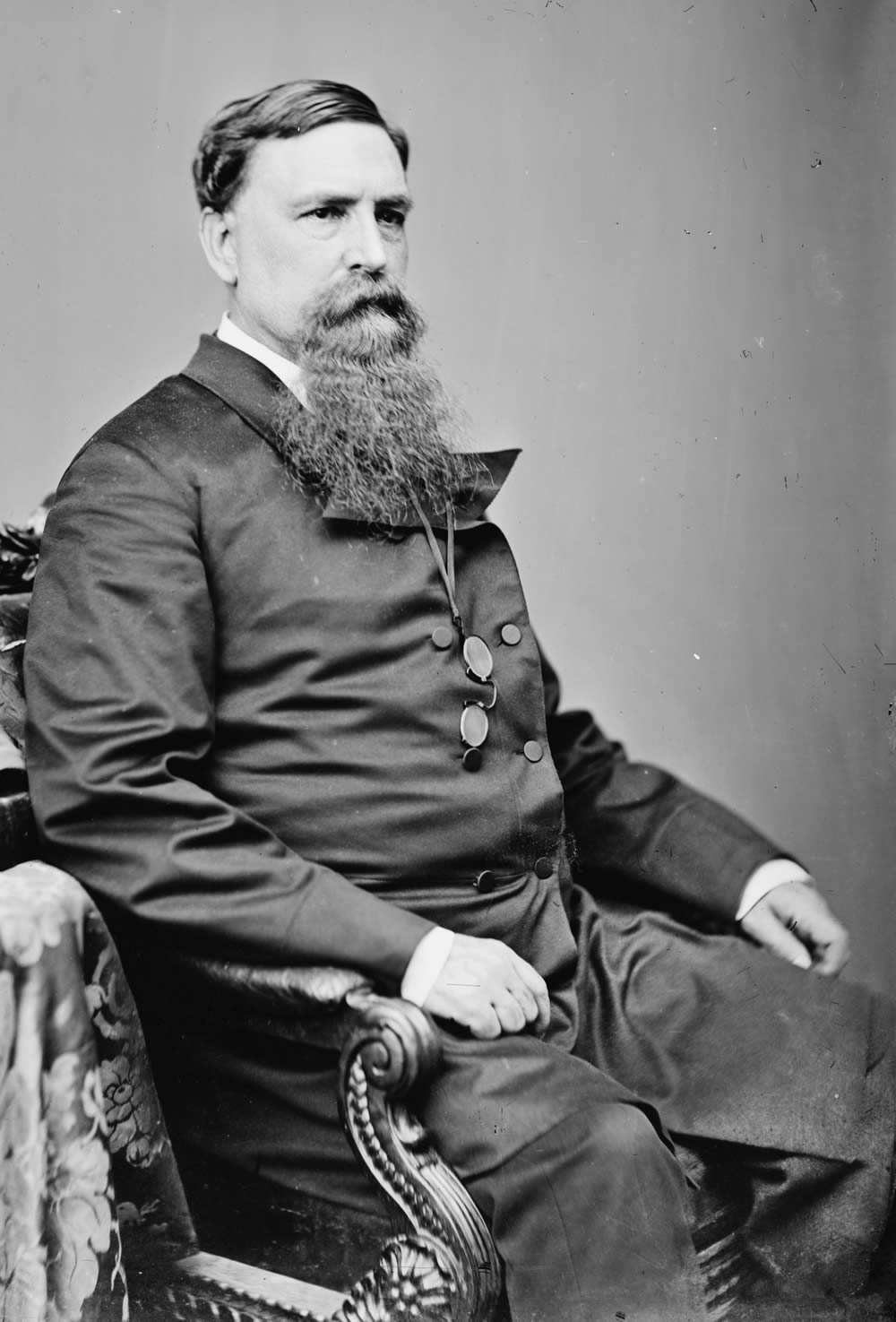
Maryland Governor Thomas Swann with a long goatee. Such beards were common around the time of the American Civil War.

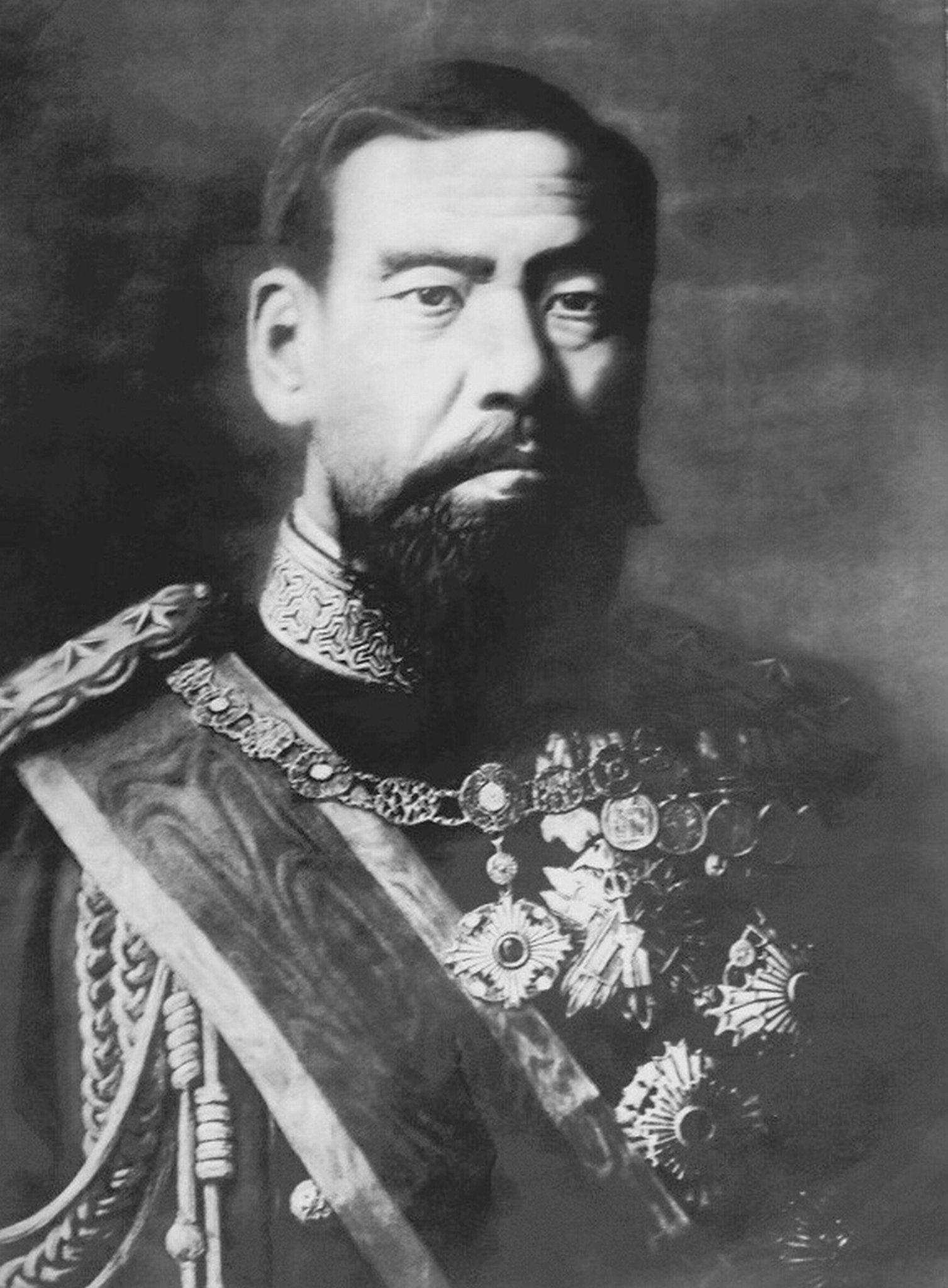
Emperor Meiji of Japan wore a full beard and moustache during most of his reign.

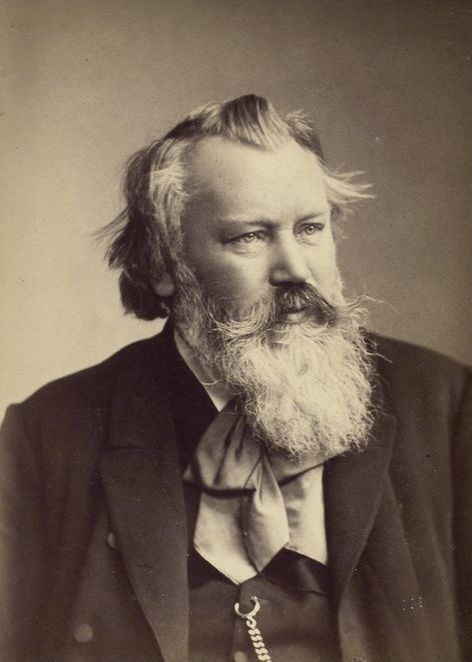
Johannes Brahms with a large beard and moustache

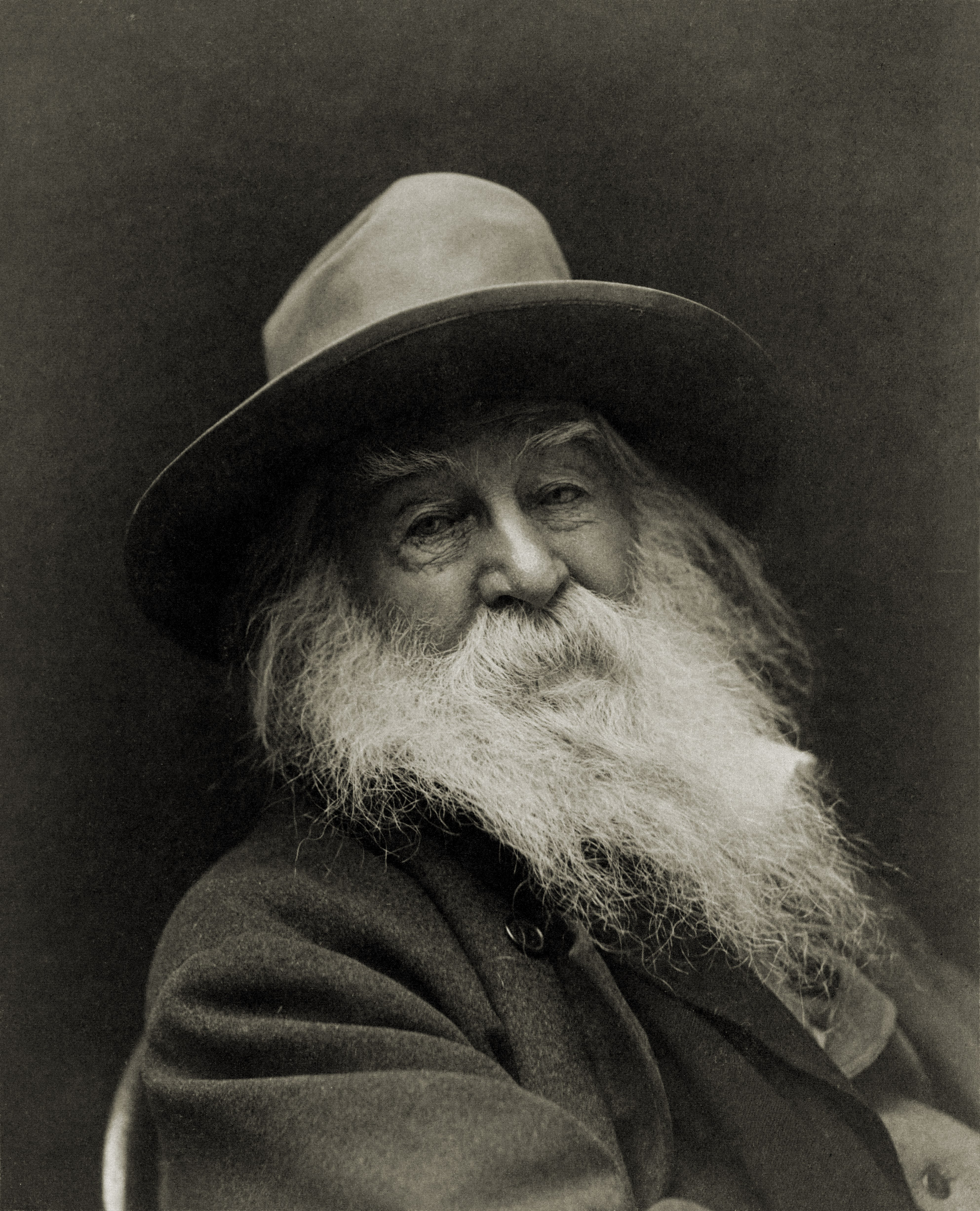
Walt Whitman with a large beard and moustache

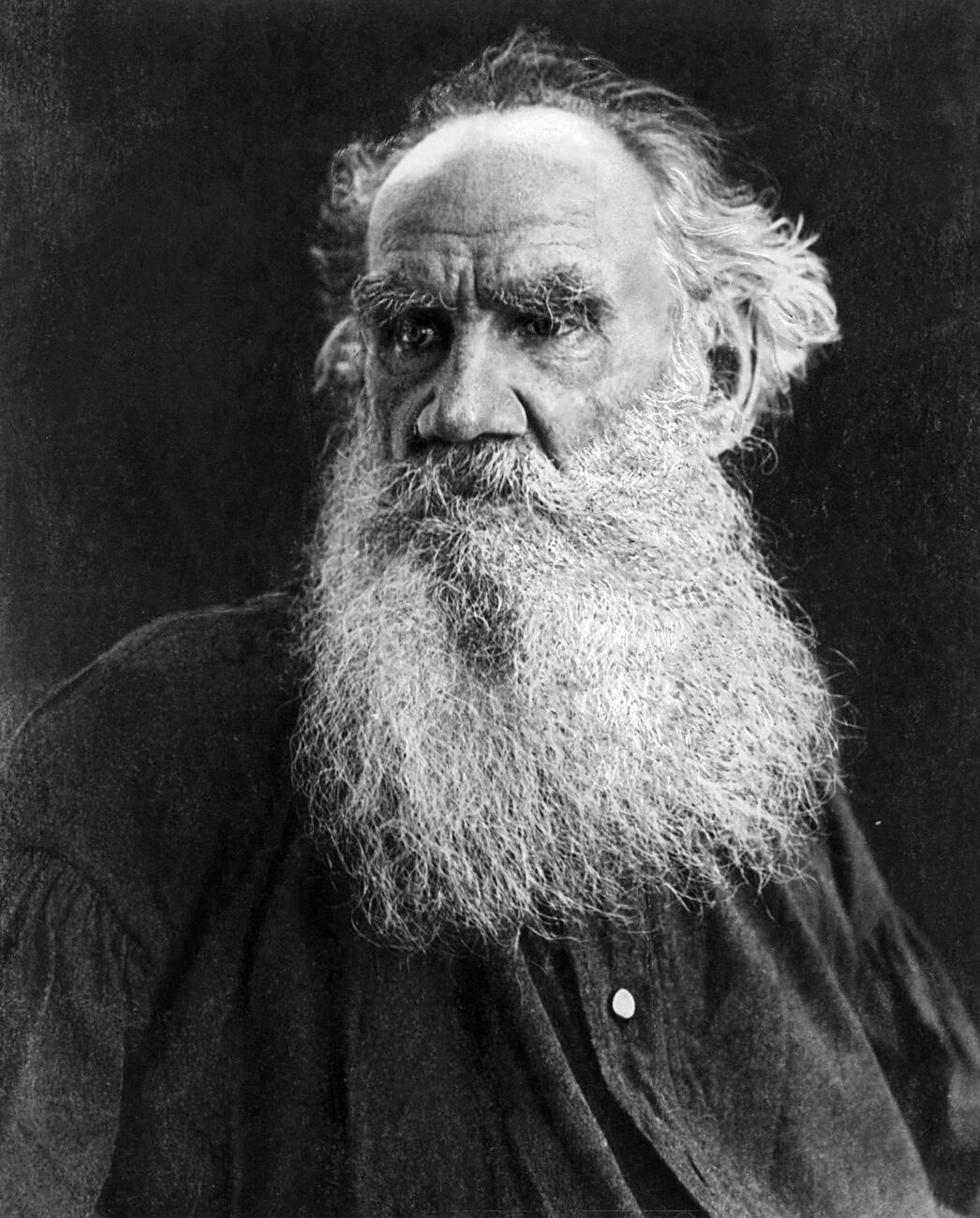
Leo Tolstoy with a large beard and moustache

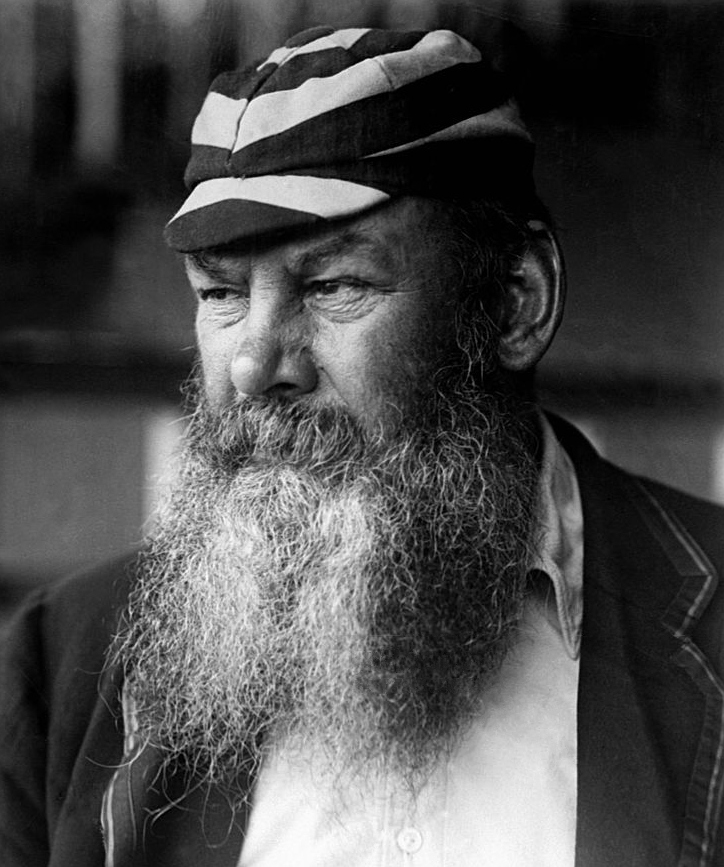
English cricketer W. G. Grace with his trademark beard

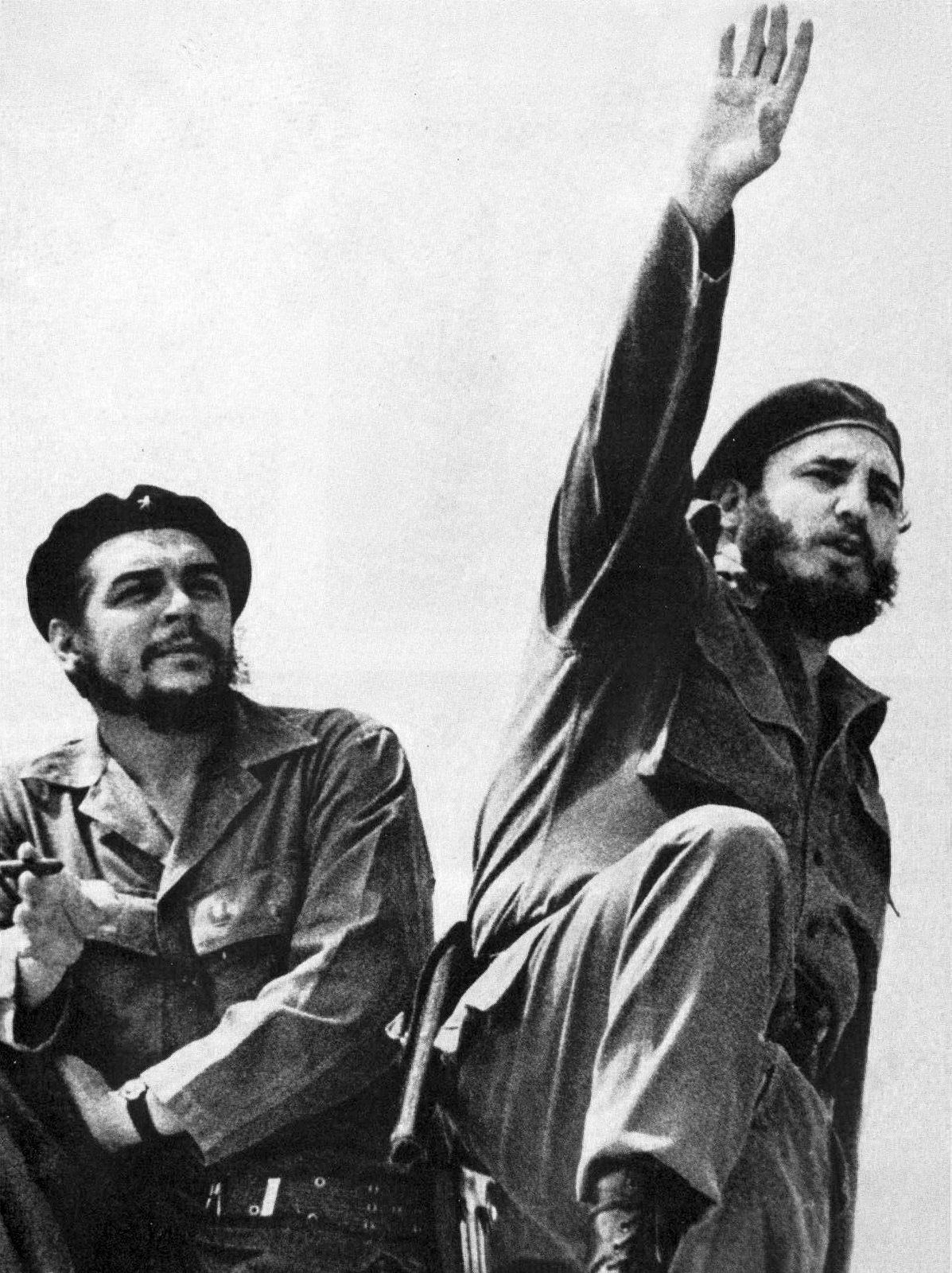
Cuban revolutionaries Che Guevara (left) and Fidel Castro (right) with patchy beards

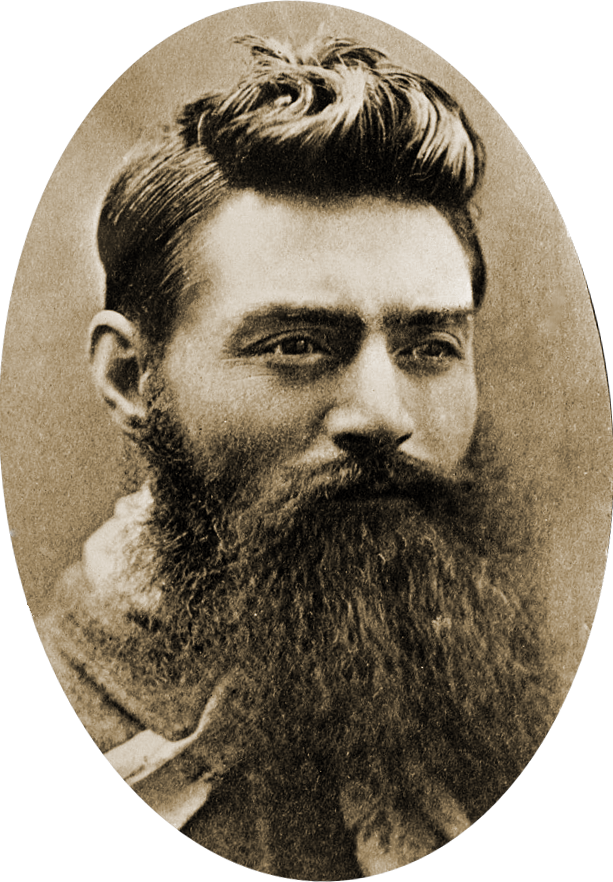
The Ned Kelly beard was named after the bushranger, Ned Kelly.

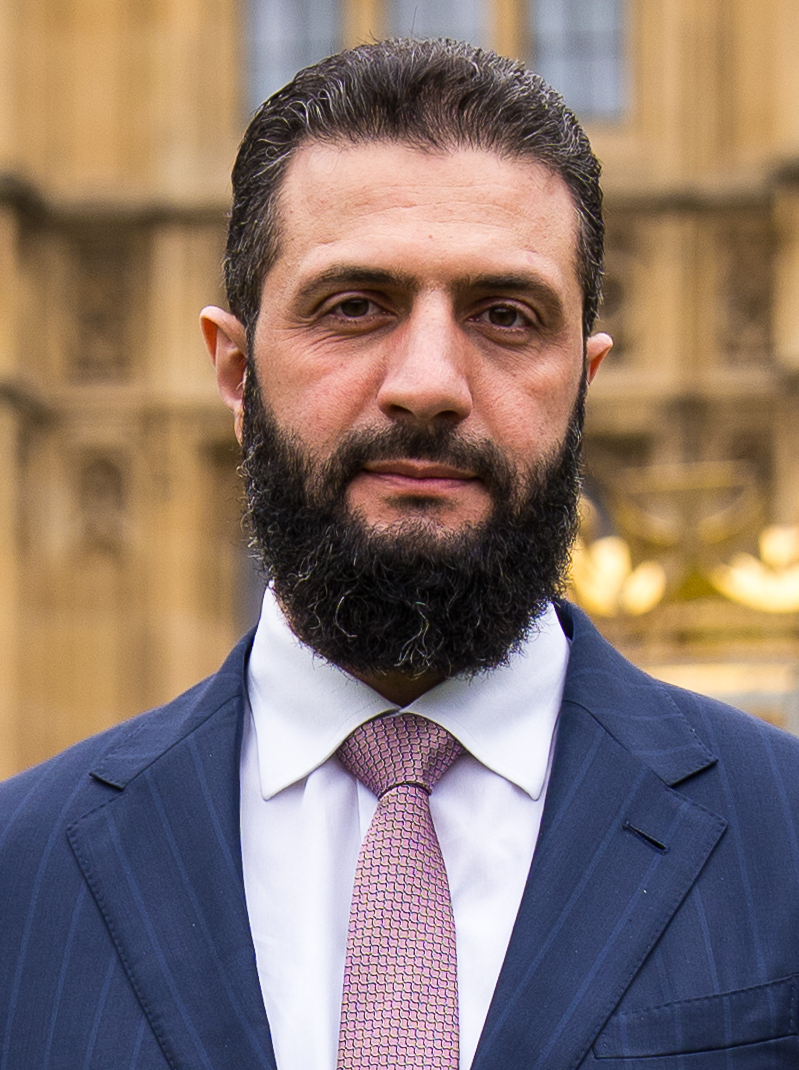
Syrian president Ahmed al-Sharaa with a large beard and moustache

== In religion ==
Beards also play a symbolic role in several religious traditions.

In Greek mythology and art, Zeus and Poseidon are always portrayed with full beards, but Apollo never is. A bearded Hermes was replaced with the more familiar beardless youth in the 5th century BCE. Zoroaster, the ancient Iranian prophet and founder of Zoroastrianism, is always depicted with a long beard. In Norse mythology and art, Odin and Thor are always portrayed with full beards.

=== Christianity ===
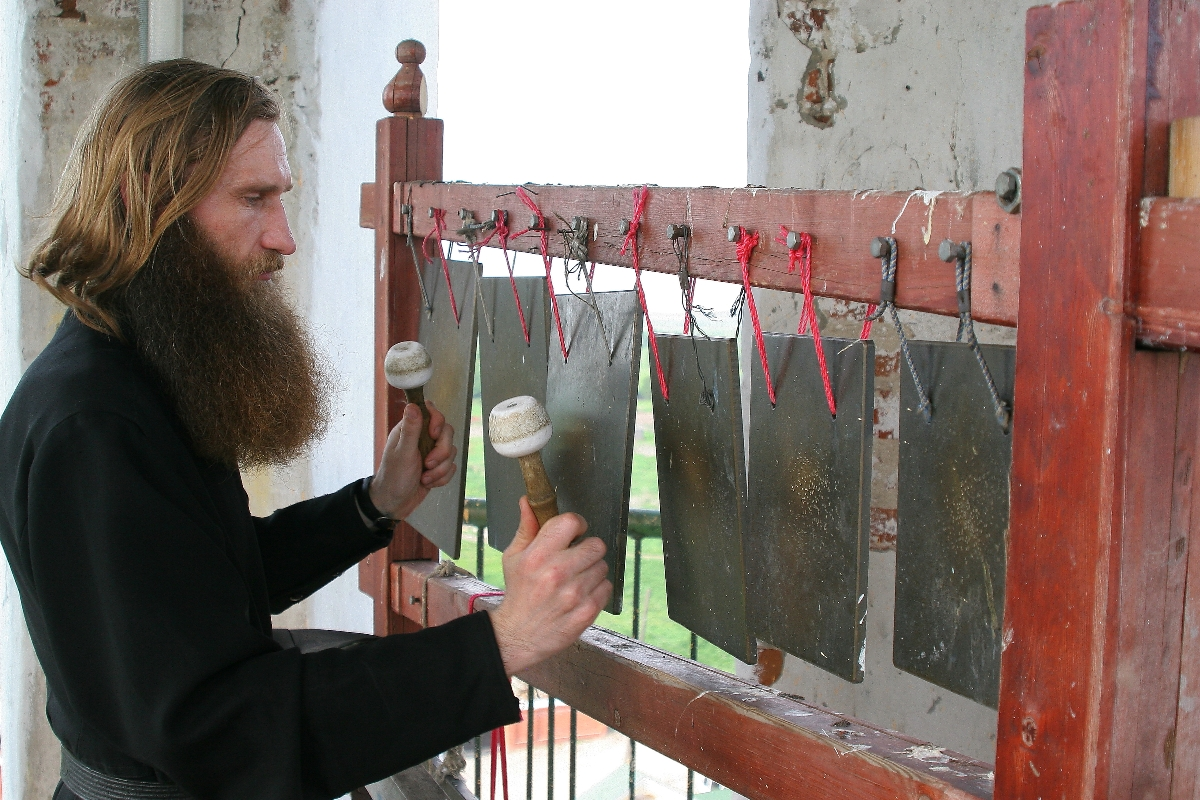
Russian Orthodox monk with a full beard playing the semantron

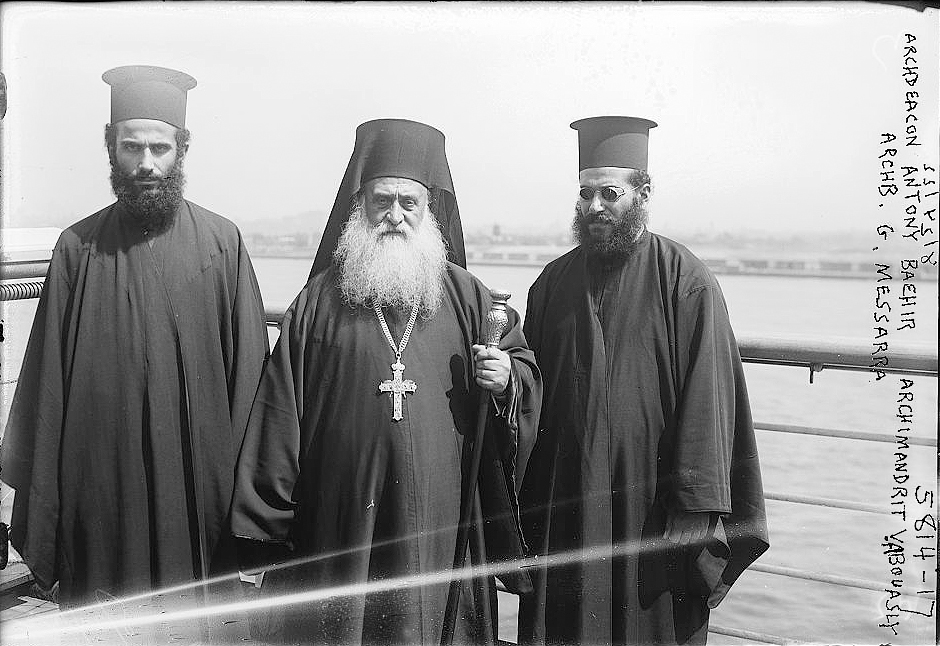
Rûm founders of the Antiochian Orthodox Christian Archdiocese of North America

Iconography and Christian art dating from the 3rd century onwards almost always portray Jesus Christ with a long beard. In paintings and statues most of the biblical patriarchs and prophets of the Old Testament, such as Moses and Abraham, and the disciples of Jesus in the New Testament, such as Peter the Apostle, appear with beards, as does his predecessor John the Baptist. However, Western European art generally depicts John the Apostle as clean-shaven, to emphasize his relative youth. Eight of the figures portrayed in the painting entitled The Last Supper by Leonardo da Vinci are bearded. Mainstream Christians believe that Isaiah 50:6 is a prophecy foretelling the Crucifixion of Jesus, and as such, as a description of Christ having his beard plucked by his tormentors.

==== Eastern Christianity ====
In Eastern Christianity, members of the priesthood and monastics often wear beards, and religious authorities at times have recommended or required beards for all male believers. Traditionally, Syrian Christians from Kerala wear long beards. Some view it as a necessity for men in the Malayali Syrian Christian community because icons of Christ and the saints with beards were depicted from the 3rd century onwards.

==== Western Christianity ====
At various times in the history of the Western world and depending on various circumstances, the Catholic Church permitted or prohibited facial hair (barbae nutritio, literally meaning "nourishing a beard") for its clergymen. A decree of the beginning of the 6th century in either Carthage or the south of Gaul forbade clerics to let their hair and beards grow freely. The phrase "nourishing a beard" was interpreted in different ways, either as imposing a clean-shaven face or only excluding a too-lengthy beard. In relatively modern times, the first pope to wear a beard was Pope Julius II, who in 1511–12 did so for a while as a sign of mourning for the loss of the city of Bologna. Pope Clement VII let his beard grow at the time of the sack of Rome in 1527 and kept it. All his successors did so until the death in 1700 of Pope Innocent XII. Since then, no pope has worn a beard.

Beards have been associated at different dates with particular Catholic religious orders. In the 1160s Burchardus, abbot of the Cistercian monastery of Bellevaux in the Franche-Comté, wrote a treatise on beards. He regarded beards as appropriate for lay brothers, but not for the priests among the monks. In about 1240, Alberic of Trois-Fontaines described the Knights Templar as an "order of bearded brethren"; and, on the eve of the suppression of the order in 1312, out of nearly 230 knights and brothers questioned by the papal commissioners in Paris, 76 are described as wearing a beard (in some cases specified as "in the style of the Templars"), while another 133 are reported to have shaved their beards, either in renunciation of their vows or in a bid to escape detection. Randle Holme, writing in 1688, associated beards with Templars, Teutonic Knights, Austin Friars, and Gregorians. Most Latin Church clergy are now clean-shaven, but Capuchins and some others are bearded. Present Canon law is silent on the matter.

Although most Protestant Christians regard the beard as a matter of choice, some have taken the lead in fashion by openly encouraging its growth as "a habit most natural, scriptural, manly, and beneficial" (C. H. Spurgeon). Amish and Hutterite men shave until they marry, then grow a beard and are never thereafter without one, although it is a particular form of a beard (see Visual markers of marital status). Diarmaid MacCulloch, professor of ecclesiastical history at the University of Oxford, writes: "There is no doubt that Cranmer mourned the dead king (Henry VIII)", and it was said that he showed his grief by growing a beard. However, MacCulloch also states that during the Reformation Era, many Protestant Reformers decided to grow their beards in order to emphasize their break with the Catholic tradition:

it was a break from the past for a clergyman to abandon his clean-shaven appearance which was the norm for late medieval priesthood; with Luther providing a precedent [during his exile period], virtually all the continental reformers had deliberately grown beards as a mark of their rejection of the old church, and the significance of clerical beards as an aggressive anti-Catholic gesture was well recognised in mid-Tudor England.

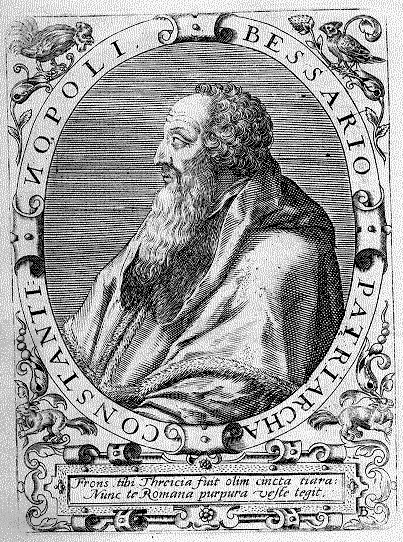
Basilios Bessarion's beard contributed to his defeat in the papal conclave of 1455.

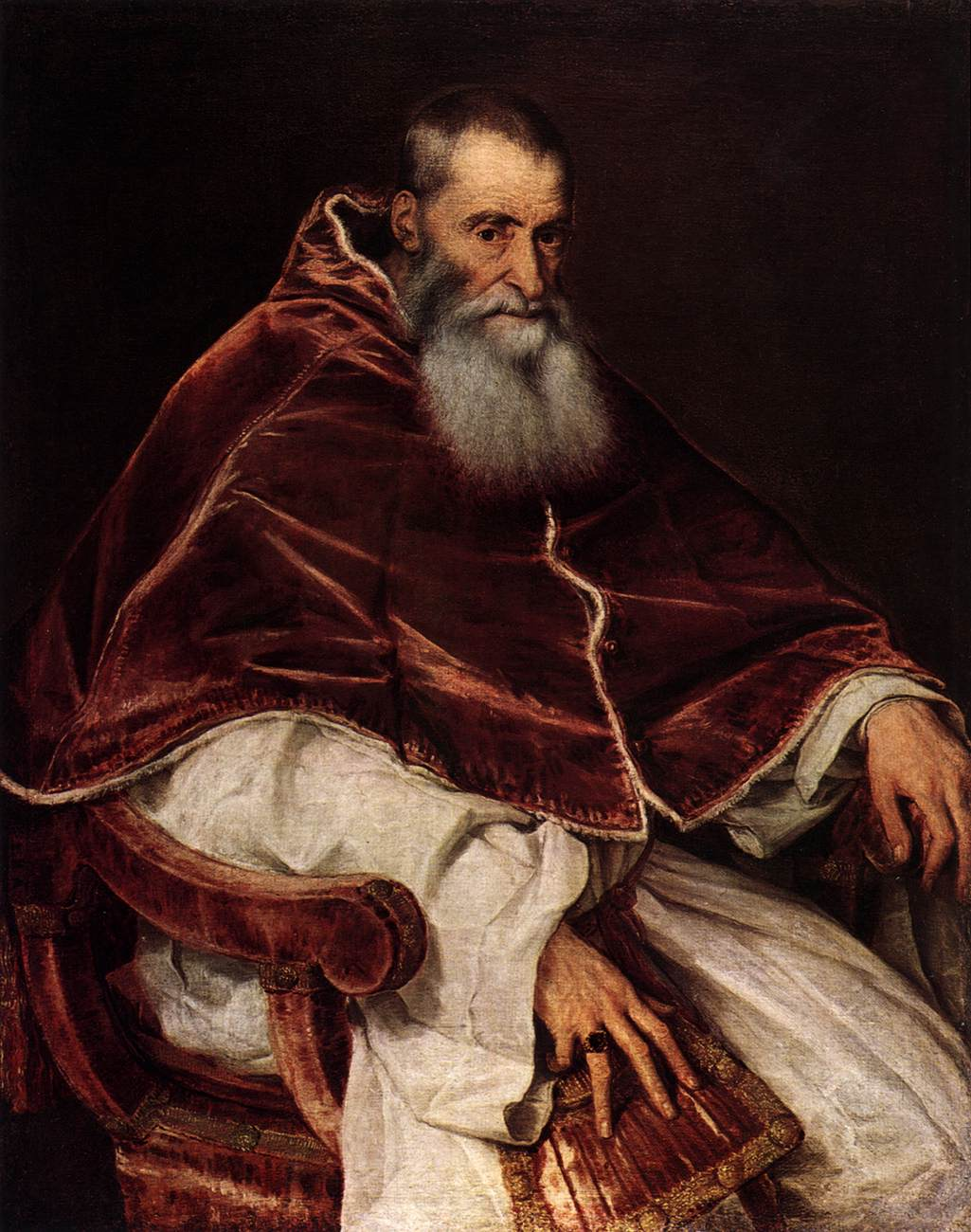
Pope Paul III (Alessandro Farnese), Bishop of Rome and ruler of the Papal States from 1534 to 1549.

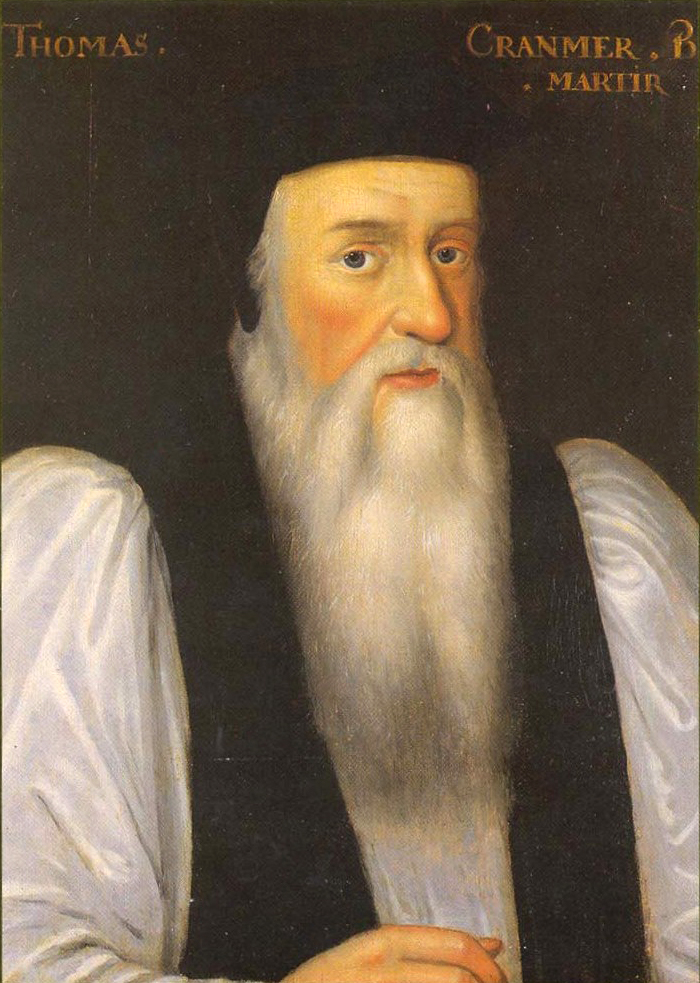
Thomas Cranmer, Archbishop of Canterbury and architect of the English Reformation, wore a long beard in his later years.

Thomas Bramwell Welch was a Methodist minister and Temperance activist

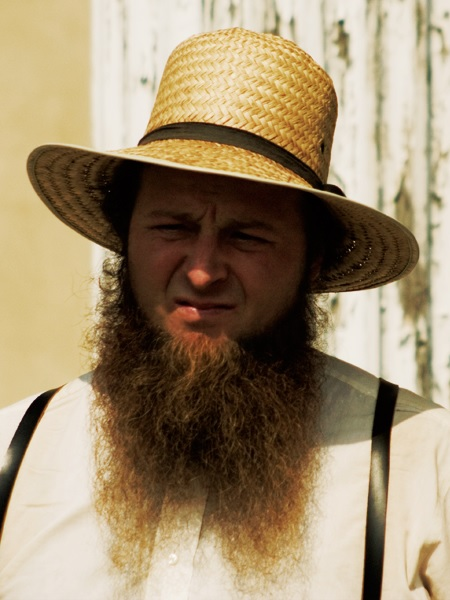
An Amish man with a Shenandoah beard

==== The Church of Jesus Christ of Latter-day Saints ====
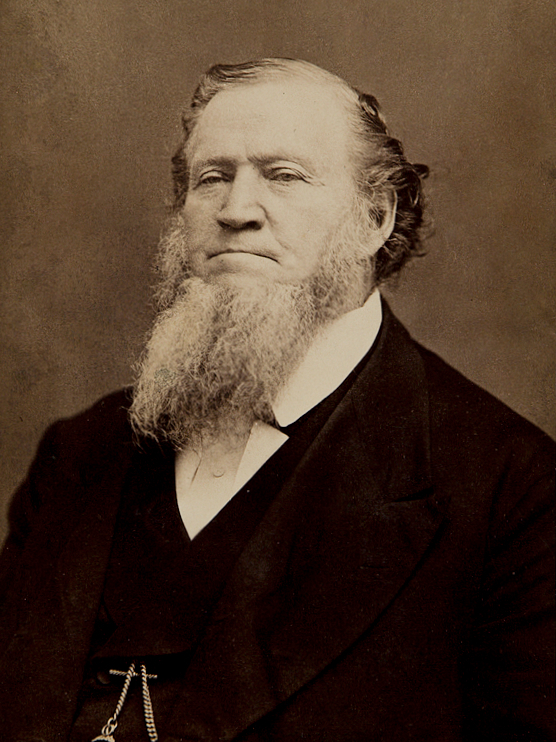
Many early LDS Church leaders (such as Brigham Young, pictured) wore beards.

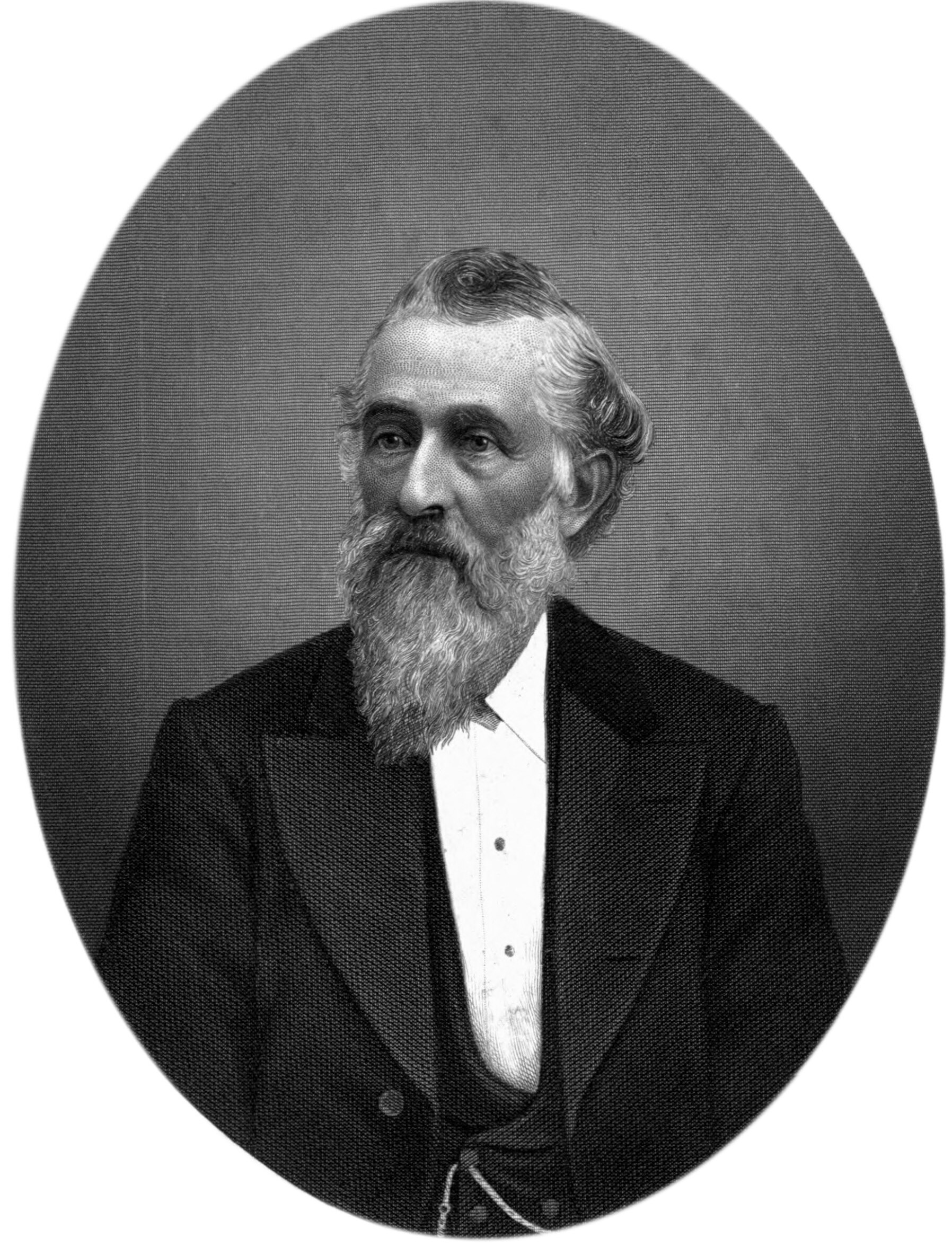
Lorenzo Snow, Mormon missionary and fifth president of The Church of Jesus Christ of Latter-day Saints

Since the mid-20th century, The Church of Jesus Christ of Latter-day Saints (LDS Church) has encouraged its male members to be clean-shaven, particularly those that serve in ecclesiastical leadership positions. The church's encouragement of men's shaving has neither scriptural nor theological basis, but stems from the general waning of facial hair's popularity in Western society during the 20th century and its association with the hippie and drug culture aspects of the counterculture of the 1960s, and has not been a permanent rule.

After Joseph Smith, many of the early presidents of the LDS Church, such as Brigham Young and Lorenzo Snow, wore large beards. Since David O. McKay became church president in 1951, most LDS Church leaders have been clean-shaven. The church maintains no formal policy on facial hair for its general membership. However, formal prohibitions against facial hair are currently enforced for young men providing two-year missionary service. Students and staff of the church-sponsored higher education institutions, such as Brigham Young University (BYU), are required to adhere to the Church Educational System Honor Code, which states in part: "Men are expected to be clean-shaven; beards are not acceptable", although male BYU students are permitted to wear a neatly groomed moustache. A beard exemption is granted for "serious skin conditions", and for approved theatrical performances, but until 2015 no exemption was given for any other reason, including religious convictions. In January 2015, BYU clarified that students who want a beard for religious reasons, like Muslims or Sikhs, may be granted permission after applying for an exemption.

BYU students led a campaign to loosen the beard restrictions in 2014, but it had the opposite effect at Church Educational System schools: some who had previously been granted beard exemptions were found no longer to qualify, and for a brief period the LDS Business College required students with a registered exemption to wear a "beard badge", which was likened to a "badge of shame". Some students also join in with shaming their fellow beard-wearing students, even those with registered exemptions.

=== Islam ===
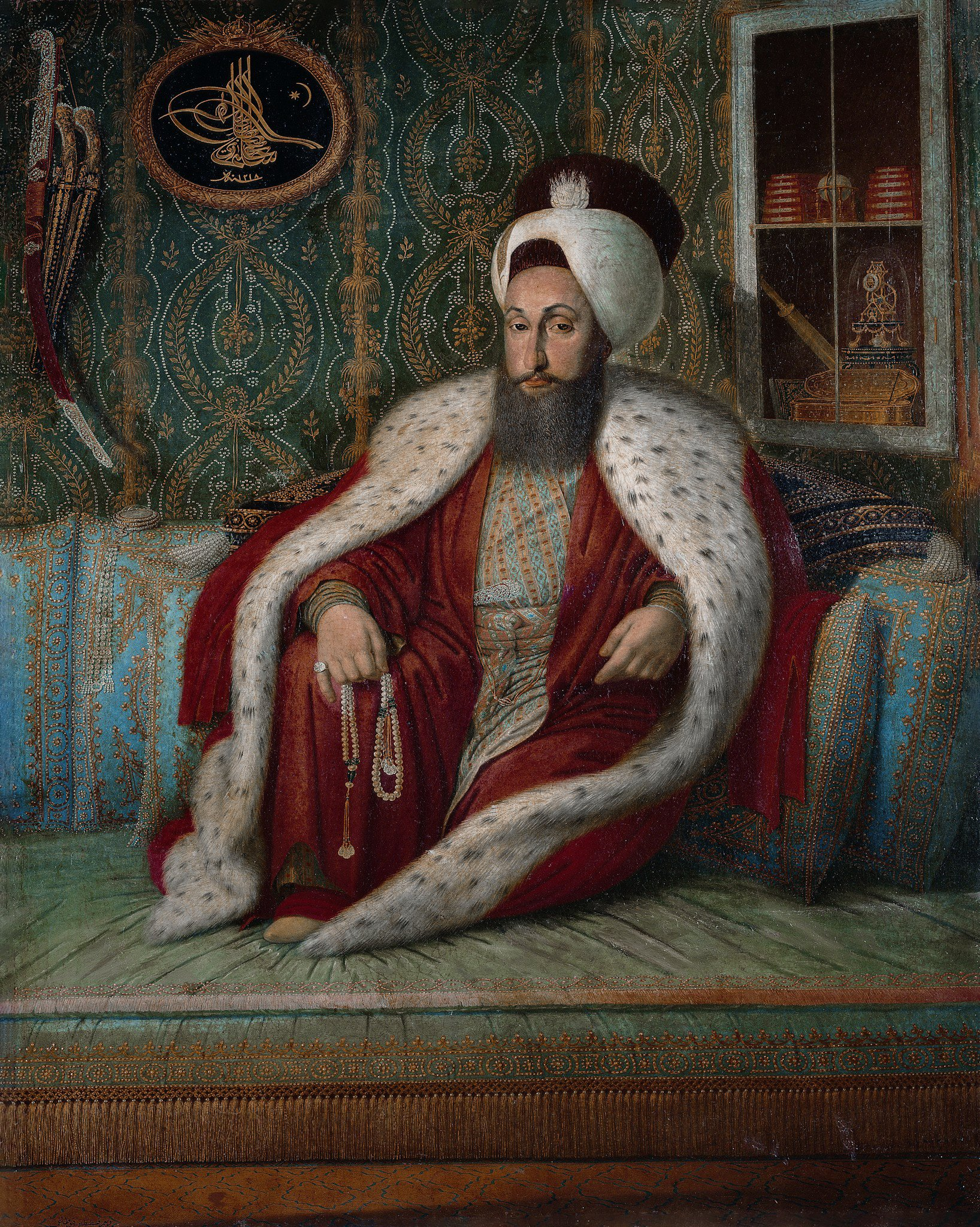
An example of an Ottoman-style beard: Sultan Selim III.

In the Quran 20:94, the Israelite patriarch Aaron is said to have had a beard. In the ḥadīth literature, it is reported that Muhammad sported a thick beard along with long head hair that reached his shoulders.

==== Sunni ====
Within Sunni Islam, there are three scholarly opinions on the beard in Islamic jurisprudence.

The first one is that growing the beard is obligatory and that shaving it is haram (forbidden) with the main source for this position being this narration:

Narrated Ibn `Umar: Allah's Messenger said, "Cut the moustaches short and leave the beard (as it is).

— Sahih al-Bukhari 5893

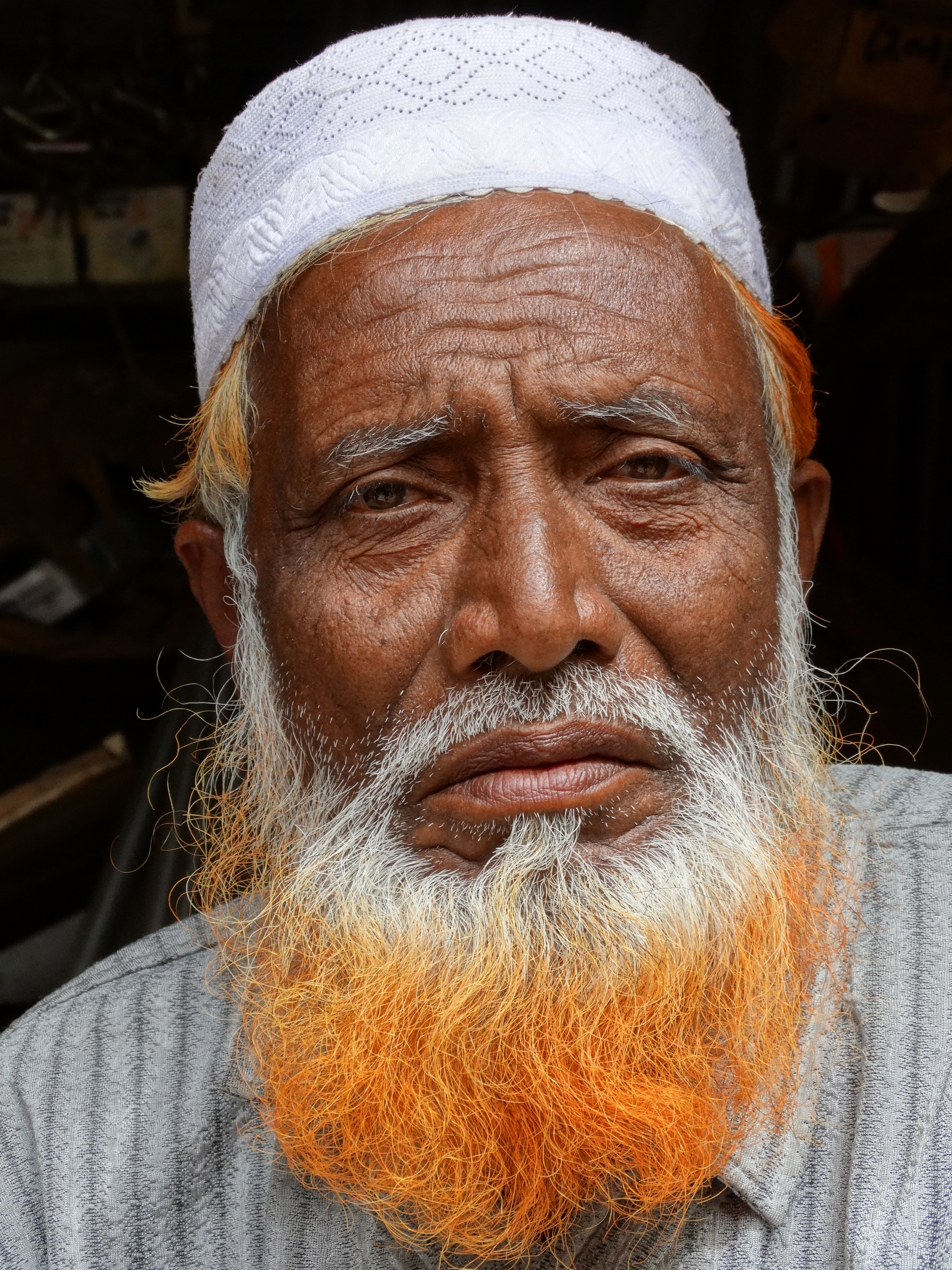
An elderly Bengali man with a beard dyed in henna.

The second one, which is the official position of the Shafi'i school, rules that the beard is only mustahabb (recommended), and shaving the beard is only makruh (disliked), but not haram (forbidden).

The third one among some contemporary Sunnī Muslim scholars, such as the Grand Mufti of Egypt Shawki Allam, is that keeping the beard is permissible and that shaving it is also permissible.

==== Shia ====
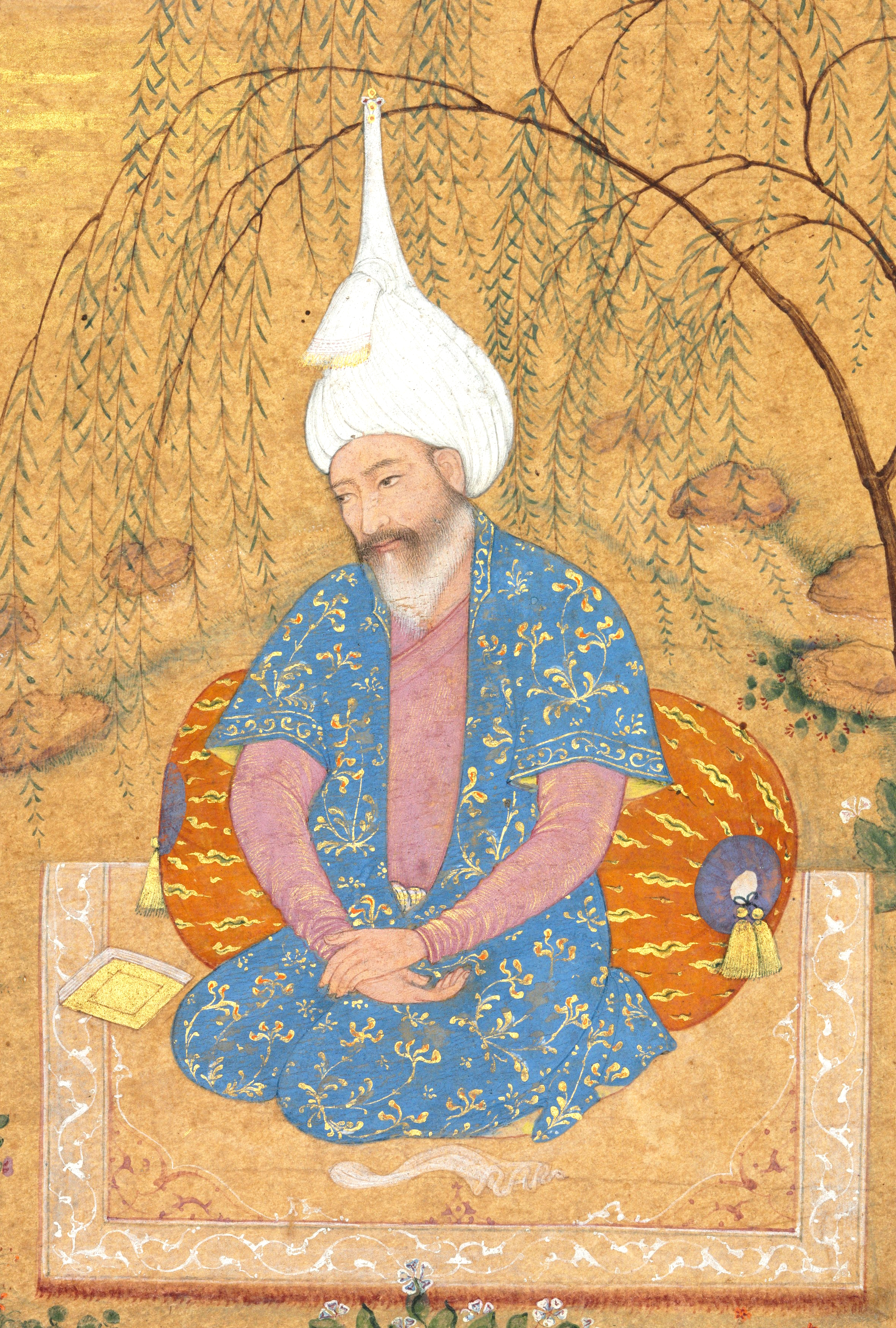
An example of a Safavid-style beard: Shah Tahmasp I.

According to the Twelver denomination of Shīʿa Islam, as per sunnah custom, the length of a beard should not exceed the width of a fist. Trimming of facial hair is allowed; however, shaving it is haram (forbidden). About the permissible size of it, according to a few Shīʿīte marjiaʿ such as Seyyed Ali Khamenei, Seyyed Ali Sistani, and others, if this (its size) is ʿurfly applicable (true of) beard, it will not be haram.

=== Judaism ===
Talmudic tradition holds that a man may not shave his beard with a razor with a single blade, since the cutting action of the blade against the skin "mars" the beard. Because scissors have two blades, some opinions in halakha (Jewish law) permit their use to trim the beard, as the cutting action comes from contact of the two blades and not the blade against the skin. For this reason, some poskim (Jewish legal deciders) rule that Orthodox Jews may use electric razors to remain clean-shaven, as such shavers cut by trapping the hair between the blades and the metal grating, halakhically a scissor-like action. However, other poskim maintain that electric shavers constitute a razor-style action and consequently prohibit their use. The Torah forbids certain shaving practices altogether, in particular Leviticus 19:27 states: "You must not round off the hair at the sides of your head, or destroy the corners of your beard."

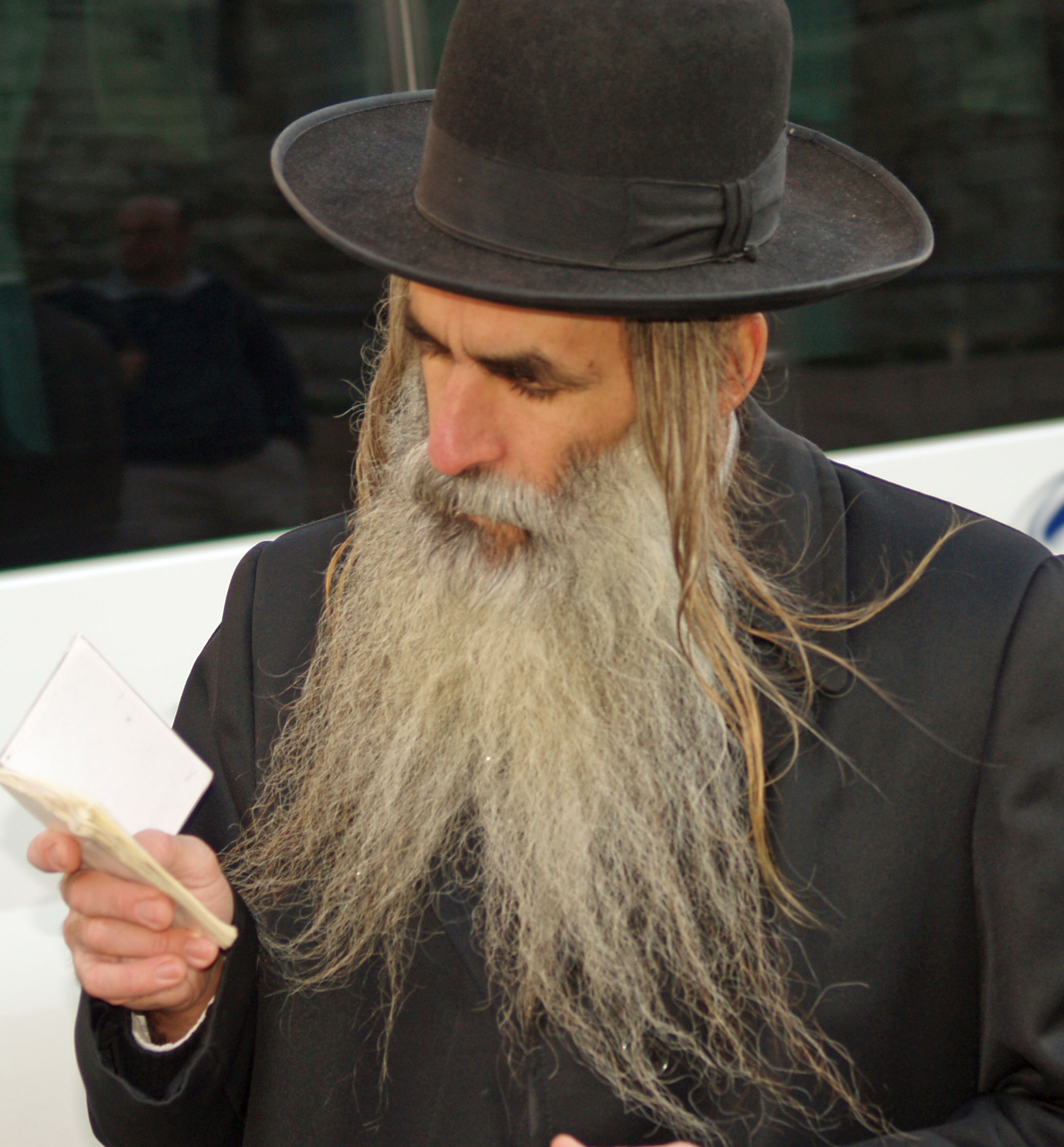
Orthodox Jew in Jerusalem with a long, unshaved beard and peyos (sidelocks)

The Mishnah interprets this as a prohibition on using a razor on the beard. This prohibition is further expanded upon in the Kabbalistic literature. The prohibition carries to modern Judaism to this day, with rabbinic opinions traditionally forbidding the use of a razor to shave between the "five corners of the beard"—although there is no uniform consensus on where these five vertices are located. Moses Maimonides criticized the shaving of the beard as being the custom of "idolatrous priests".

The Zohar, one of the primary sources of Kabbalah (Jewish mysticism), attributes Sacred to the beard, specifying that hairs of the beard symbolize channels of subconscious holy energy that flows from above to the human soul. Therefore, most Hasidic Jews, for whom Kabbalah plays an important role in their religious practice, traditionally do not remove or even trim their beards.

Traditional Jews refrain from shaving, trimming the beard, and haircuts during certain times of the year like Passover, Sukkot, the Counting of the Omer, and the Three Weeks. Cutting the hair is also restricted during the 30-day mourning period after the death of a close relative, known in Hebrew as the Shloshim (thirty).

=== Hinduism ===
The ancient Hindu texts regarding beards depend on the Vedas and other teachings, varying according to whom the devotee worships or follows. Many sadhus, yogis, or yoga practitioners keep beards in all stages of life. Shaivite ascetics generally have beards, as they are not permitted to own anything, which would include a razor. The beard is also a sign of a nomadic and ascetic lifestyle. Vaishnava men, typically of the ISKCON sect, are often clean-shaven as a sign of cleanliness.

Hindu Sadhus with beards

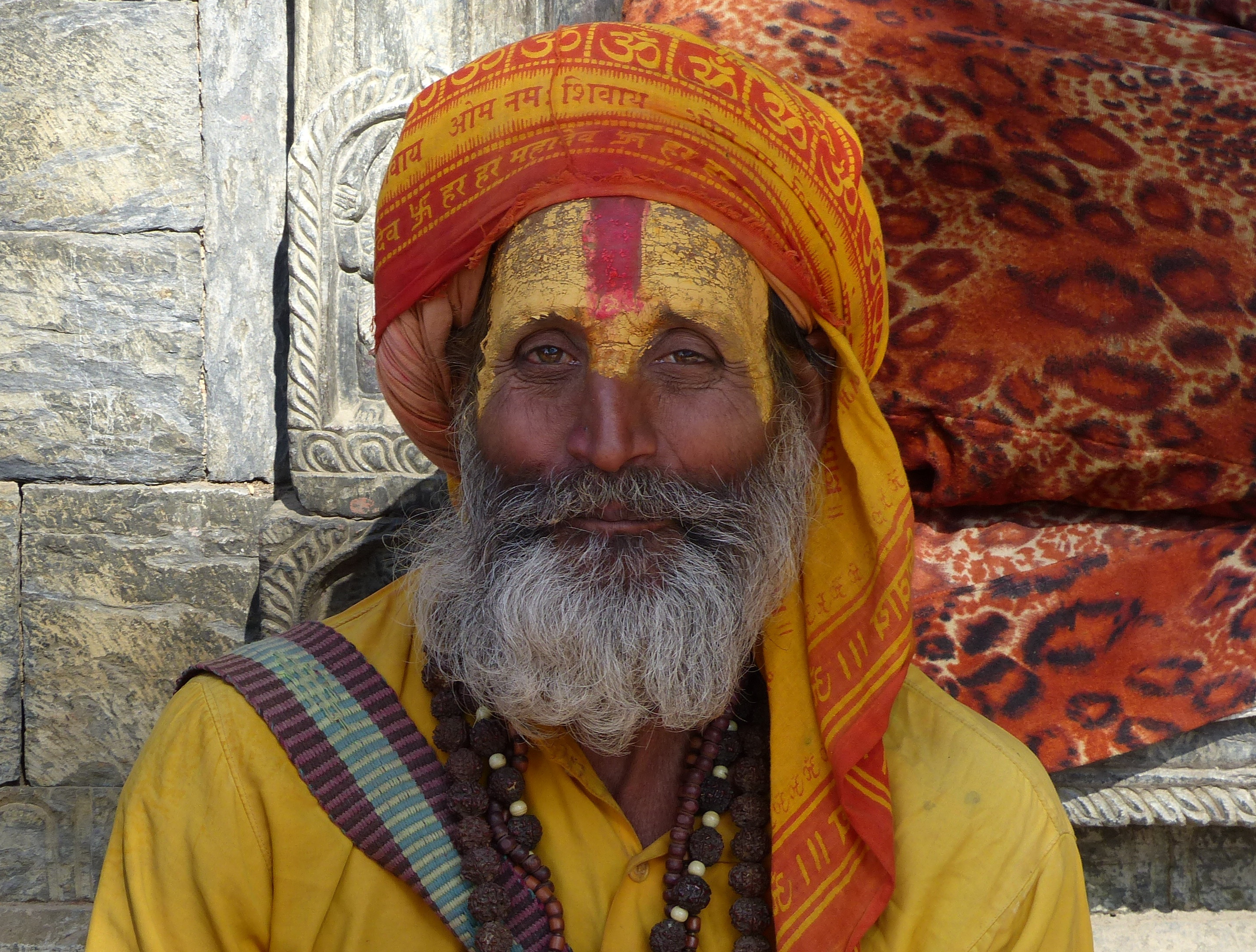

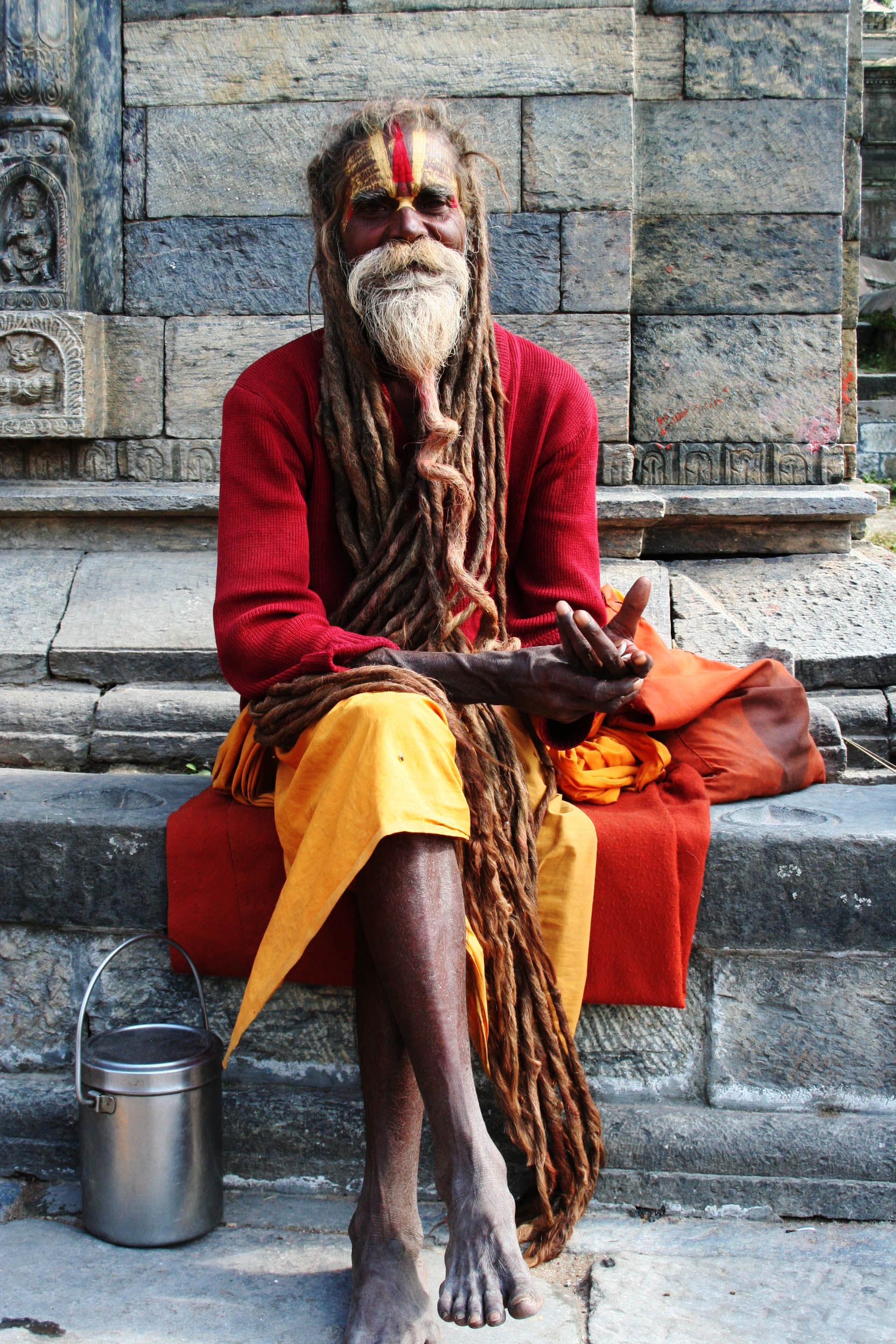

=== Sikhism ===
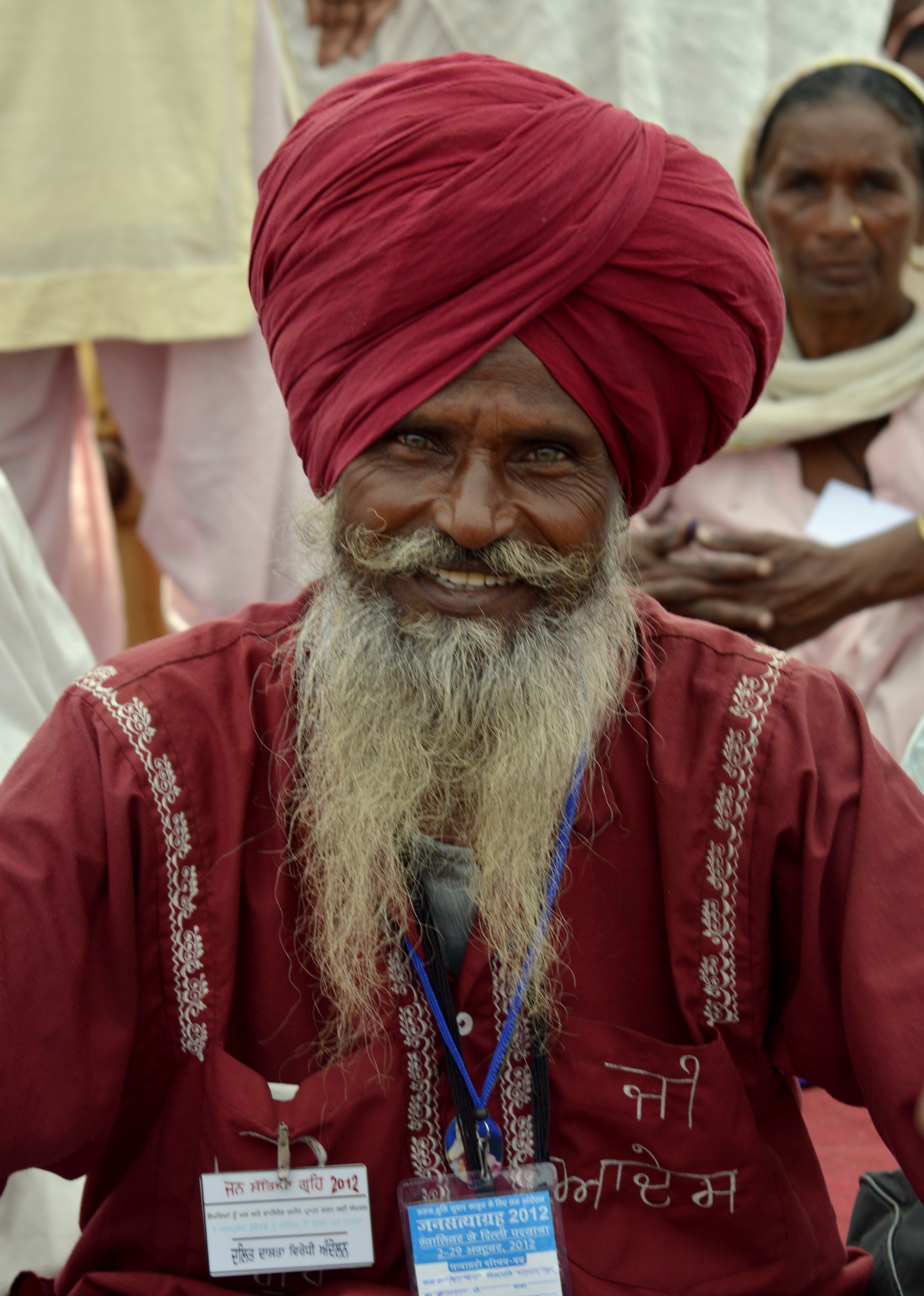
Sikh man with a long, unshaved beard and turban (dastār) covering his uncut hair

Guru Gobind Singh, the tenth Sikh Guru, commanded the Sikhs to maintain unshorn hair, recognizing it as a necessary adornment of the body as well as a mandatory Article of Faith. Sikhs consider the beard to be part of the nobility and dignity of their manhood. Sikhs also refrain from cutting their hair and beards out of respect for the God-given form. Keeping the hair uncut is kesh, one of the Five Ks, the compulsory articles of faith for a baptized Sikh. As such, a Sikh man is easily identified by his turban (dastār) and uncut hair and beard.

=== Rastafari movement ===
Male Rastafarians wear uncut hair and beards in conformity with injunctions given in the Old Testament of the Christian Bible, such as Leviticus 21:5, which reads: "They shall not make any baldness on their heads, nor shave off the edges of their beards, nor make any cuts in their flesh." The beard is a symbol of the covenant between God (Jah or Jehovah in Rastafari usage) and his people.

== Modern prohibition ==
=== Civilian prohibitions ===
Professional airline pilots are required to be shaven to facilitate a tight seal with auxiliary oxygen masks. However, some airlines have recently lifted such bans in light of modern studies. Similarly, firefighters may also be prohibited from full beards to obtain a proper seal with SCBA equipment. Other jobs may prohibit beards as necessary to wear masks or respirators.

Isesaki City in Gunma Prefecture, Japan, decided to ban beards for male municipal employees on 19 May 2010.

The U.S. Court of Appeals for the Eighth Circuit has found requiring shaving to be discriminatory.

==== Sports ====
The International Boxing Association prohibits the wearing of beards by amateur boxers, although the Amateur Boxing Association of England allows exceptions for Sikh men, on condition that the beard be covered with a fine net.

The Cincinnati Reds baseball team had a longstanding enforced policy where all players had to be completely clean-shaven (no beards, long sideburns or moustaches). However, this policy was abolished following the sale of the team by Marge Schott in 1999.

Under owner George Steinbrenner, the New York Yankees baseball team had a strict appearance policy that prohibited long hair and facial hair below the lip; the regulation was continued under Hank and Hal Steinbrenner when control of the Yankees was transferred to them after the 2008 season. Willie Randolph and Joe Girardi, both former Yankee assistant coaches, adopted a similar clean-shaven policy for their ballclubs: the New York Mets and Miami Marlins, respectively. Fredi Gonzalez, who replaced Girardi as the Marlins' manager, dropped that policy when he took over after the 2006 season. Yankees legend Don Mattingly restored said policy upon becoming Marlins manager in 2016, but dropped it immediately after only one season.

The Playoff beard is a tradition common with teams in the National Hockey League, and now in other leagues where players allow their beards to grow from the beginning of the playoff season until the playoffs are over for their team. Even then, players such as Joe Thornton and Brent Burns grew large, bushy beards in the regular season. However, executive Lou Lamoriello became notorious for his enforcement of an appearance policy similar to the Yankees during his front office tenures with the New Jersey Devils, the Toronto Maple Leafs and the New York Islanders. Lamoriello would allow players to grow beards during the playoffs, however.

In 2008, some members of the County Tyrone Gaelic football team vowed not to shave until the end of the season. They went on to win the All-Ireland football championship, some of them sporting impressive beards by that stage.

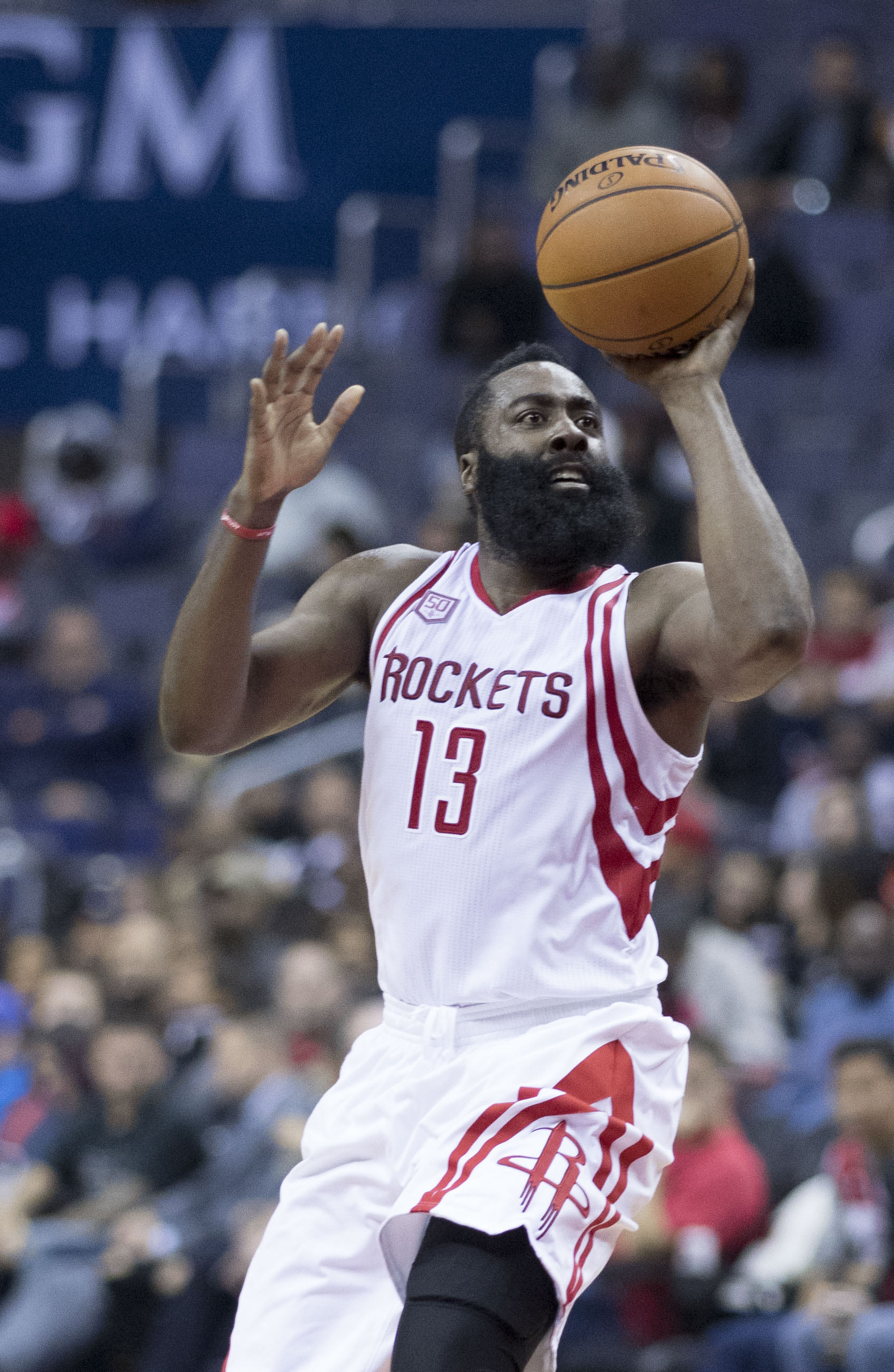
James Harden, nicknamed "the Beard"

Canadian Rugby Union flanker Adam Kleeberger attracted much media attention before, during, and after the 2011 Rugby World Cup in New Zealand. Kleeberger was known, alongside teammates Jebb Sinclair and Hubert Buydens as one of "the beardoes". Fans in the stands could often be seen wearing fake beards and "fear the beard" became a popular expression during the team's run in the competition. Kleeberger, who became one of Canada's star players in the tournament, later used the publicity surrounding his beard to raise awareness for two causes; Christchurch earthquake relief efforts and prostate cancer. As part of this fundraising, his beard was shaved off by television personality Rick Mercer and aired on national television. The "Fear the Beard" expression was coined by the NBA's Oklahoma City Thunder fans and was previously used by Houston Rockets fans to support James Harden.

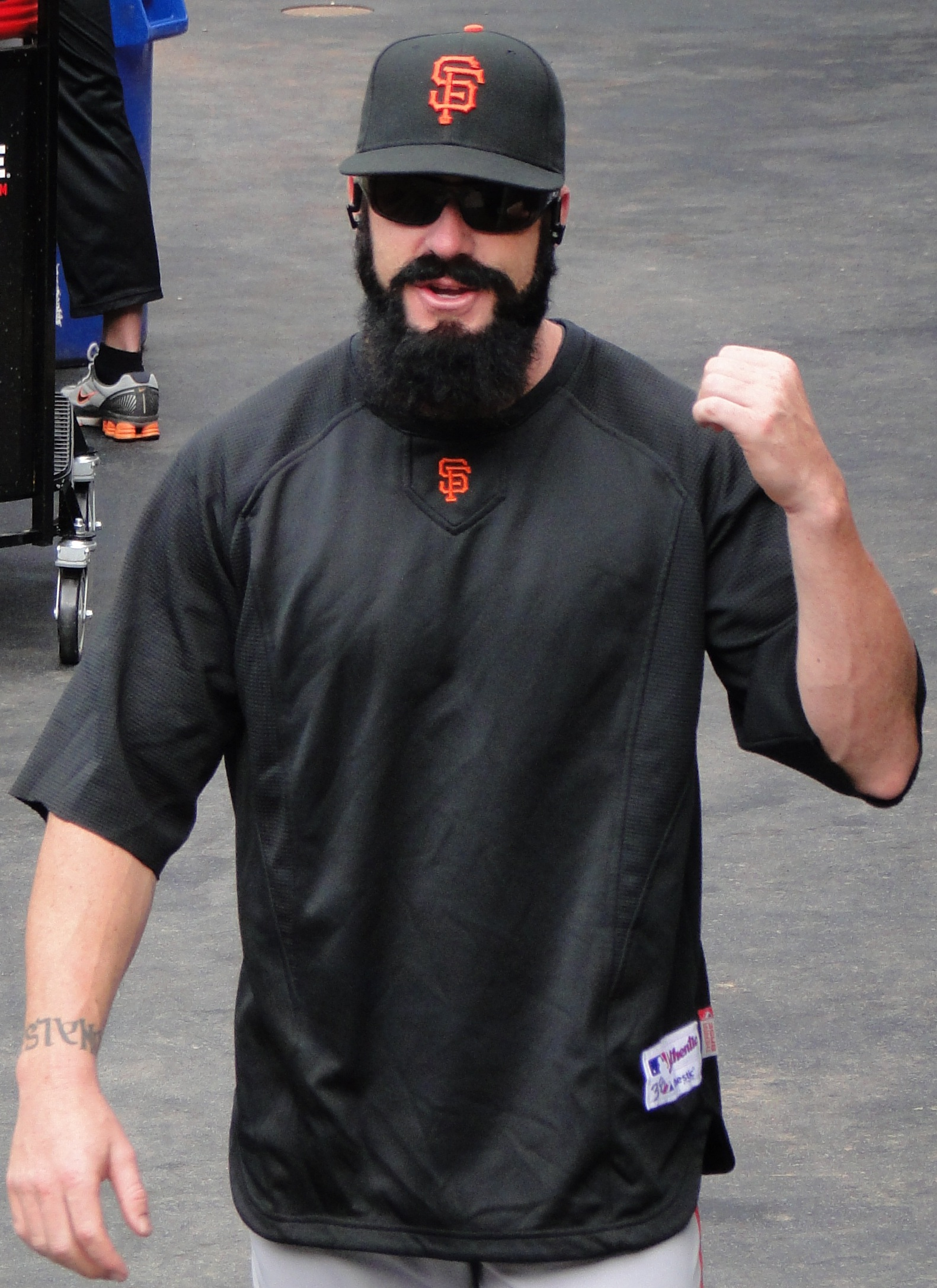
Brian Wilson's beard in 2011

San Francisco Giants relief pitcher Brian Wilson, who claims not to have shaved since the 2010 All-Star Game, has grown a big beard that has become popular in MLB and with its fans. MLB Fan Cave presented a "Journey Inside Brian Wilson's Beard", which was an interactive screenshot of Wilson's beard, where one can click on different sections to see various fictional activities performed by small "residents" of the beard. The hosts on sports show sometimes wear replica beards, and the Giants gave them away to fans as a promo.

The 2013 Boston Red Sox featured at least 12 players with varying degrees of facial hair, ranging from the closely trimmed beard of slugger David Ortiz to the long shaggy looks of Jonny Gomes and Mike Napoli. The Red Sox used their beards as a marketing tool, offering a Dollar Beard Night, where all fans with beards (real or fake) could buy a ticket for $1.00; and also as means of fostering team camaraderie.

Beards have also become a source of competition between athletes. Examples of athlete "beard-offs" include NBA players DeShawn Stevenson and Drew Gooden in 2008, and WWE wrestler Daniel Bryan and Oakland Athletics outfielder Josh Reddick in 2013.

=== Armed forces ===
Depending on the country and period, facial hair was either prohibited in the army or an integral part of the uniform.

== Styles ==
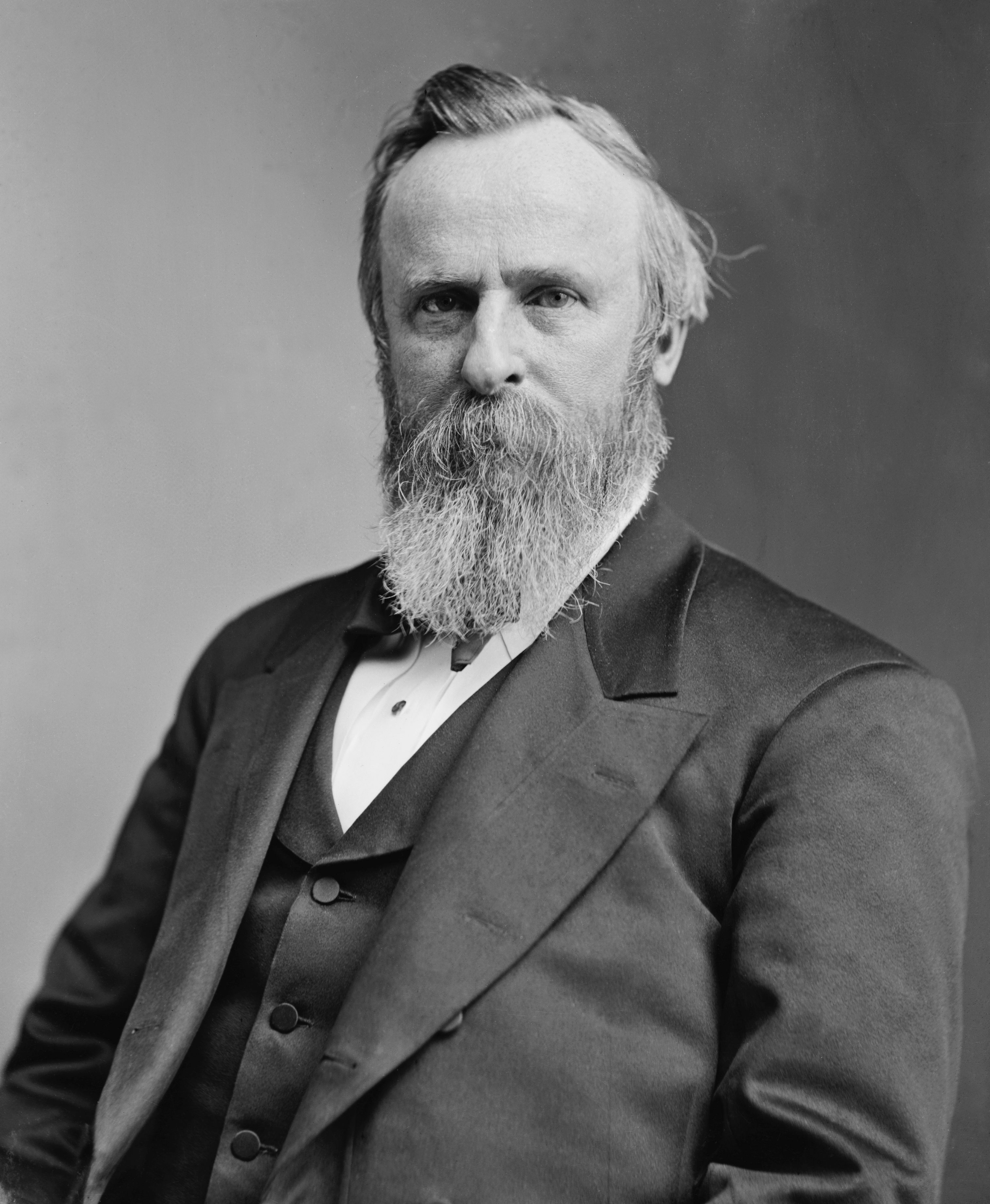
U.S. President Rutherford B. Hayes with a full beard

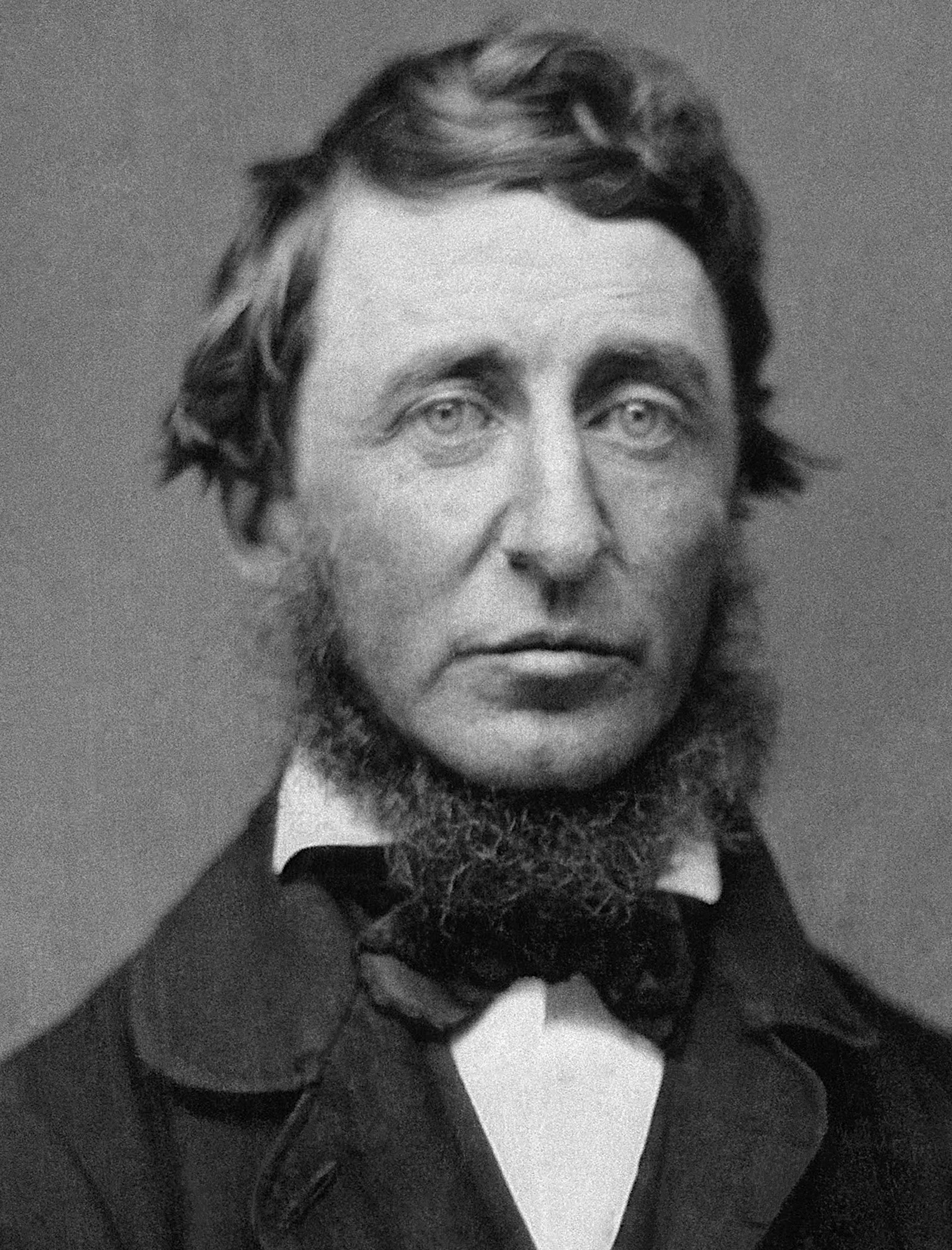
Henry David Thoreau with a neckbeard

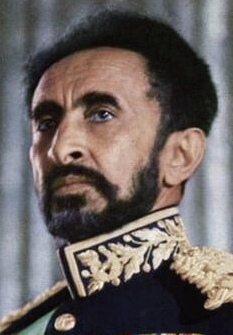
Emperor Haile Selassie of Ethiopia with short beard

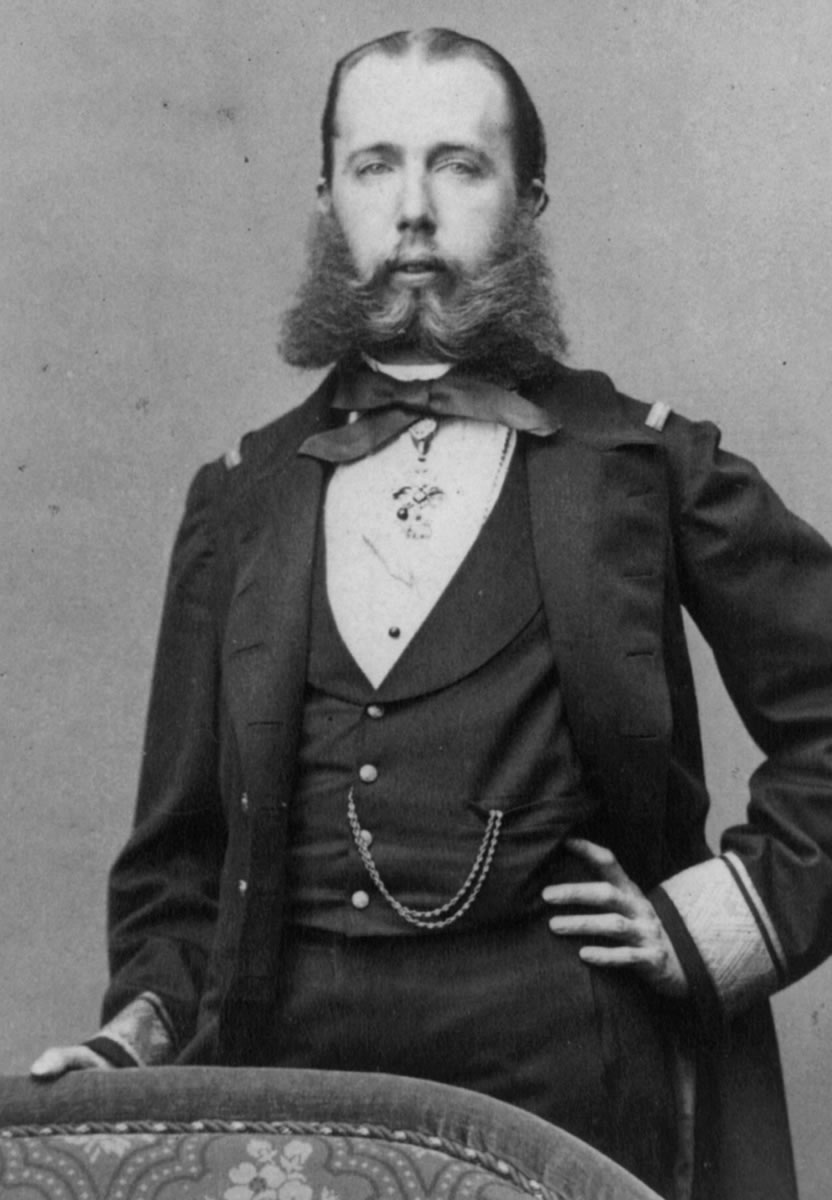
Emperor Maximilian I of Mexico

Beard hair is most commonly removed by shaving or by trimming with the use of a beard trimmer. If only the area above the upper lip is left unshaven, the resulting facial hairstyle is known as a mustache; if hair is left only on the chin, the style is a goatee.

- Full: downward flowing beard with either a styled or integrated mustache
- Garibaldi: wide, full beard with rounded bottom and integrated mustache
- Old Dutch: A large, long beard, connected by sideburns, that flares outward in width at the bottom, without a mustache.
- Sideburns: hair grown from the temples down the cheeks toward the jawline. Worn by Ambrose Burnside (the namesake of the style), Isaac Asimov and Carlos Menem.
- Jawline beard: A beard that is grown from the chin along the jawline. Chinstrap, chin curtain and brett are all variations of a jawline beard with distinctions being chin coverage and sideburn length.
- Chinstrap: a beard with long sideburns that comes forward and ends under the chin.
- Chin curtain: similar to the chinstrap beard but covers the entire chin. Also called a Lincoln, Shenandoah, or spade.
- Brett: similar to the chin curtain beard, but does not connect to the sideburns.
- Neckbeard: similar to the chinstrap, but with the chin and jawline shaven, leaving hair to grow only on the neck. While never as popular as other beard styles, a few noted historical figures have worn this type of beard, such as Nero, Horace Greeley, Henry David Thoreau, William Empson, Peter Cooper, Moses Mendelssohn, Richard Wagner, and Michael Costa.
- Circle beard: Commonly mistaken for the goatee, the circle beard is a small chin beard that connects around the mouth to a mustache. Also called a doorknocker.
- Designer stubble: A short growth of the male beard that was popular in the West in the 1980s, and experienced a resurgence in popularity in the 2010s.
- Sea captain: A rounded, bottom-heavy beard of medium length with short sides that is often paired with a longer mustache.
- Goatee: A tuft of hair grown on the chin, sometimes resembling a billy goat's.
- Junco: A goatee that extends upward and connects to the corners of the mouth but does not include a mustache, like the circle beard.
- Meg: A goatee that extends upward and connects to the mustache, this word is commonly used in the south east of Ireland.
- Van Dyke: a goatee accompanied by a mustache.
- Monkey tail: a Van Dyke as viewed from one side, and a Lincoln plus mustache as viewed from the other, giving the impression that a monkey's tail stretches from an ear down to the chin and around one's mouth.
- Hollywoodian: a beard with an integrated mustache that is worn on the lower part of the chin and jaw area, without connecting sideburns.
- Reed: a beard with an integrated mustache that is worn on the lower part of the chin and jaw area that tapers towards the ears without connecting sideburns.
- Royale: a narrow pointed beard extending from the chin. The style was popular in France during the period of the Second Empire, from which it gets its alternative name, the imperial or impériale.
- Verdi: a short beard with a rounded bottom and slightly shaven cheeks with a prominent mustache
- Muslim beard: Full beard with the mustache trimmed
- Soul patch: a small beard just below the lower lip and above the chin
- Glitter beard: Beard dipped in glitter.
- Hulihee: clean-shaven chin with fat chops connected at the mustache.
- Friendly mutton chops: long mutton chop-type sideburns connected to a mustache, but with a shaved chin and neck.
- Stashburns or the Lemmy: sideburns that drop down the jaw but jut upwards across the mustache, leaving the chin exposed. Similar to friendly mutton chops. Often found in southern and southwestern American culture (see, for example, the Yosemite Sam caricature).
- Closed or Tied beard: Mostly seen among modern Sikh youth, this is a kind of full beard tied by using a sticky liquid or Gel and stiffens below the chin.
- Oakley beard: Described by Indian makeup artist Banu as "neither a French beard nor a full beard". She used the look for Rajinikanth in Enthiran (2010).

== Maintenance ==
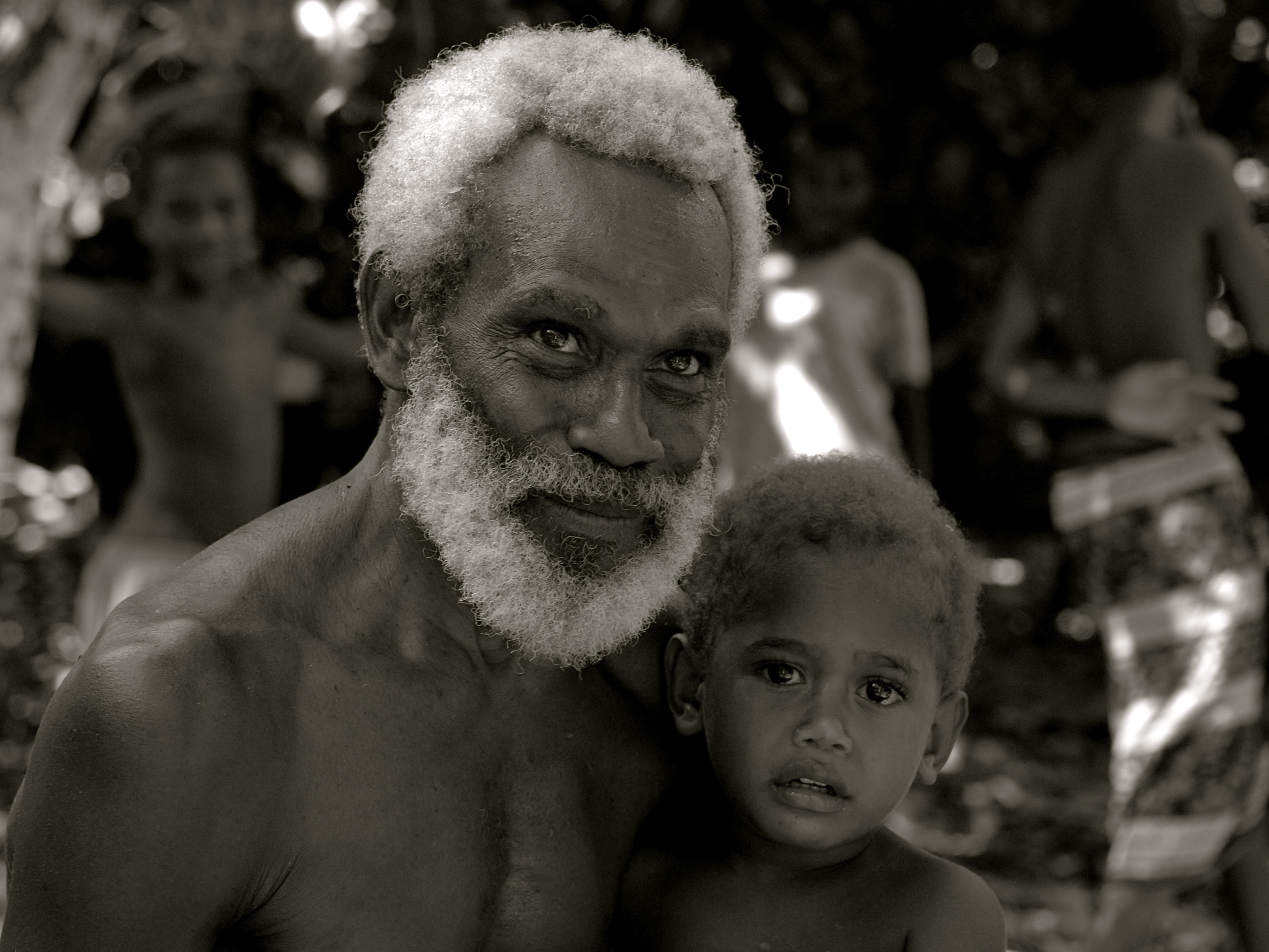
A bearded man with his grandson in East New Britain, Papua New Guinea

For appearance and cleanliness, some people maintain their beards by exfoliating the skin, using soap or shampoo and sometimes conditioner, and afterward applying oils for softness.

== In animals ==
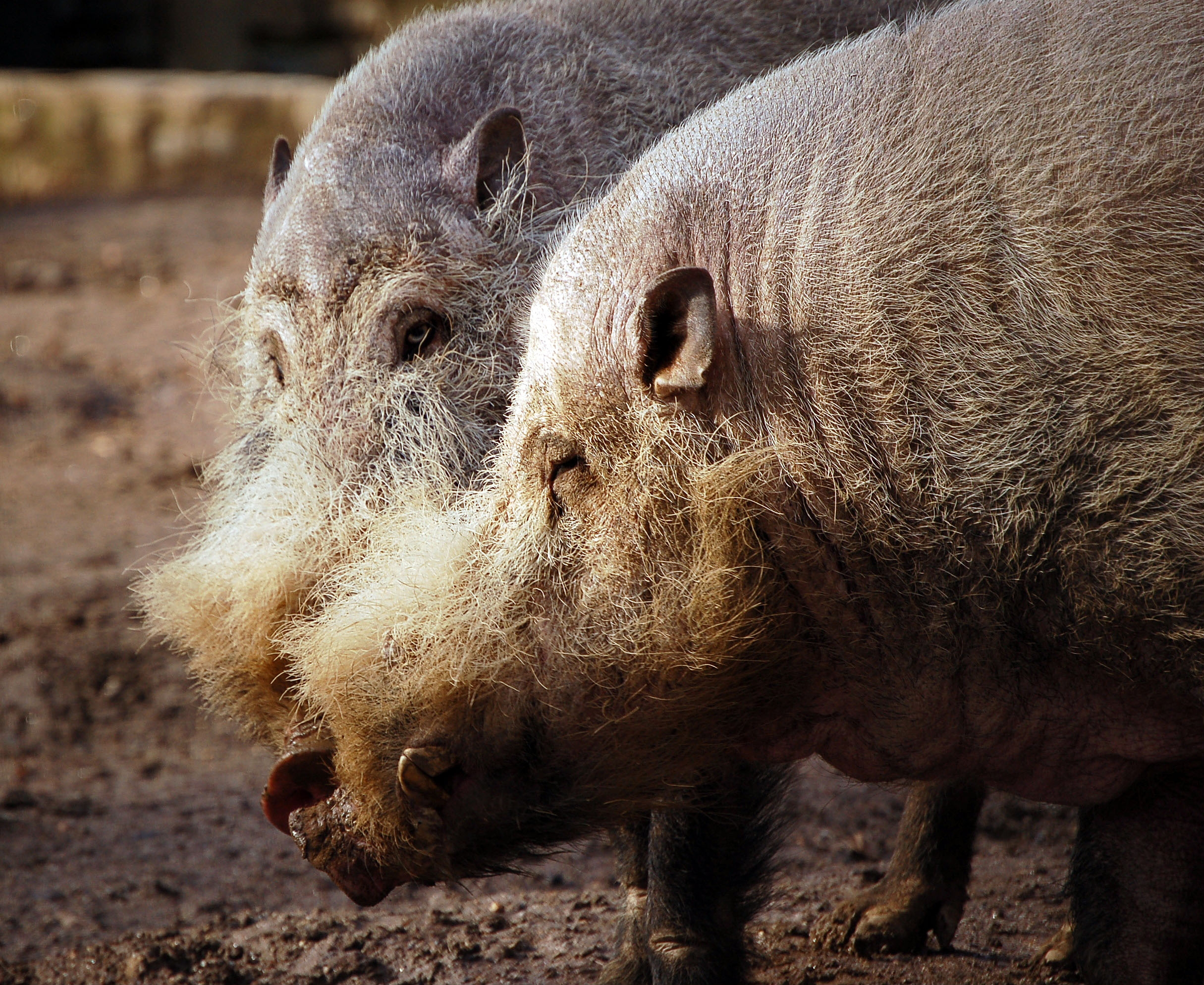
Bornean bearded pigs

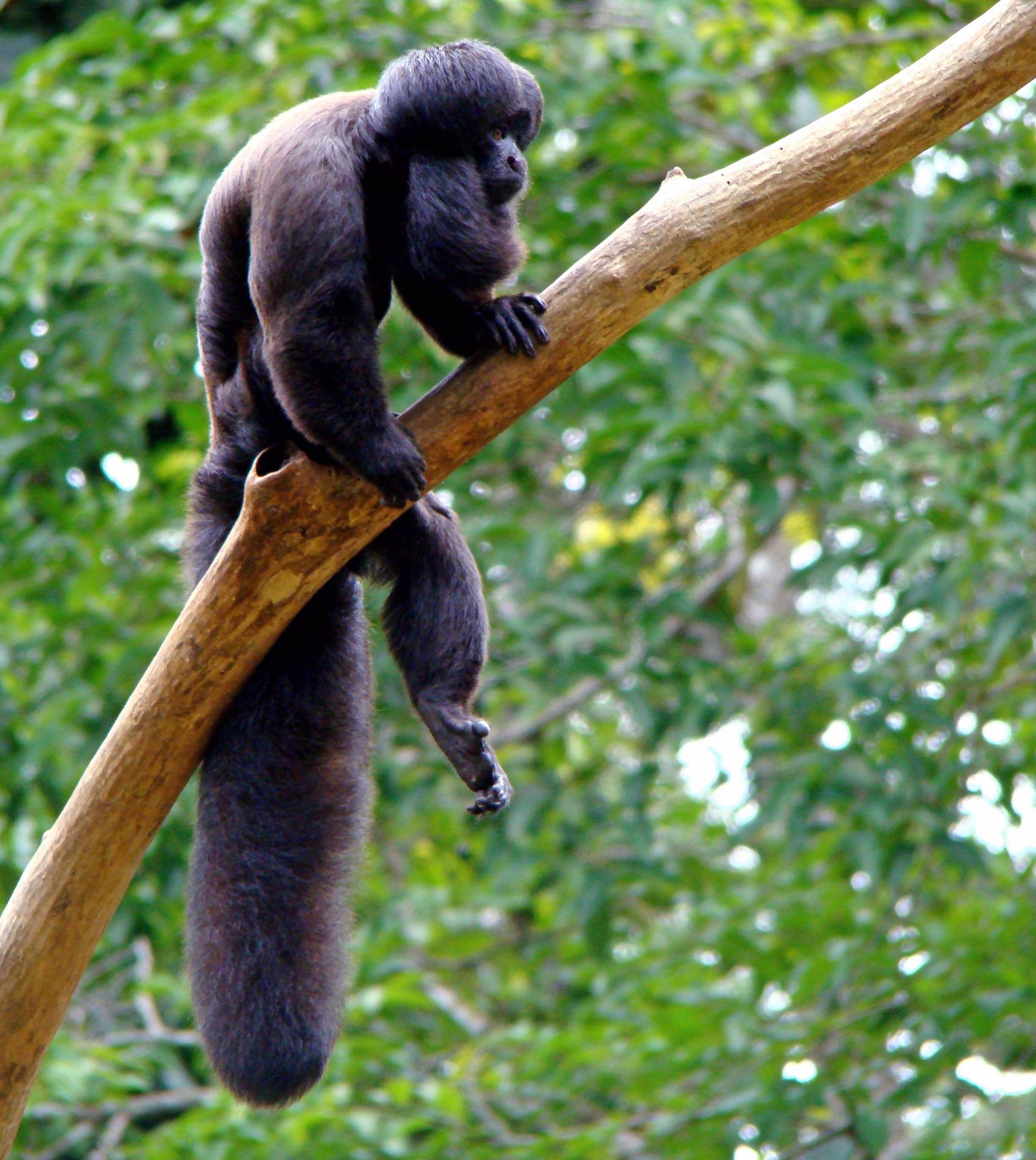
A bearded saki

The term "beard" is also used for a collection of stiff, hairlike feathers on the centre of the breast of a turkey. Normally, the turkey's beard remains flat and may be hidden under other feathers, but when the bird is displaying, the beard becomes erect and protrudes several centimetres from the breast.

Many goats possess a beard. The orangutan also possesses a beard.

Several animals are termed "bearded" as part of their common name. Sometimes a beard of hair on the chin or face is prominent but for some others, "beard" may refer to a pattern or colouring of the pelage reminiscent of a beard.

- Bearded barbet
- Bearded Collie
- Bearded dragon
- Bearded pig
- Bearded reedling
- Bearded saki
- Bearded seal
- Bearded vulture
- Bearded woodpecker

== See also ==
- List of facial hairstyles
- Barbatus (disambiguation), a common Latin name, meaning "bearded"
- Beard Liberation Front
- Joseph Palmer (communard) defended himself from being forcibly shaved in 1830
- The Beards (Australian band)
- World Beard and Moustache Championships
- Shaving
