= Tavernette =

- Frazione
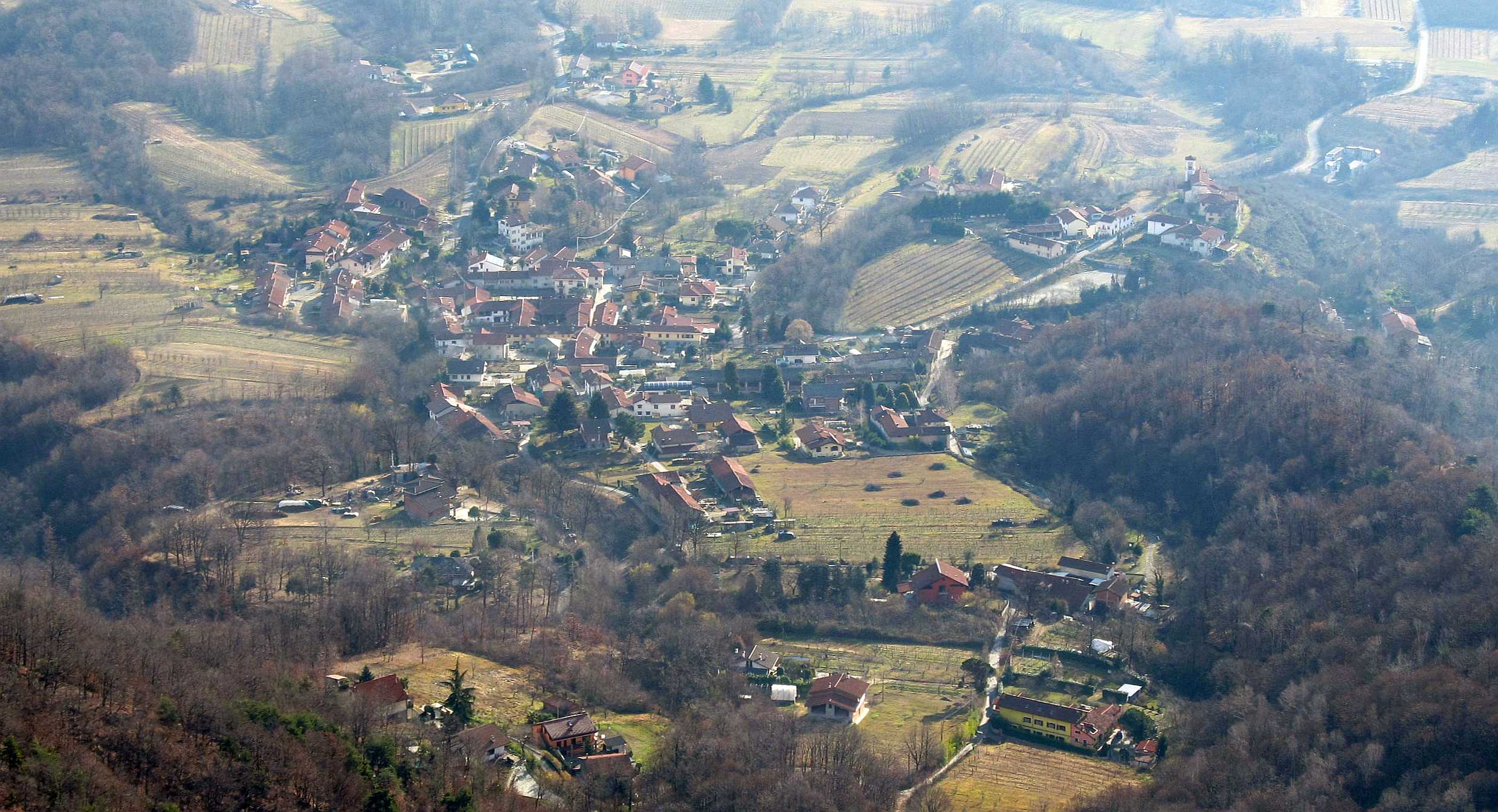
- Panoramic view from Rocca Due Denti

- Location of Tavernette in Italy
- Coordinates: 44°57′09″N 7°22′27″E
- Country: Italy
- Region: Piedmont
- Province: Turin (TO)
- Comune: Cumiana
- Elevation: 374 m (1,227 ft)

Population (2001)
  - Total: 236
- Time zone: UTC+1 (CET)
  - Summer (DST): UTC+2 (CEST)
- Postal code: 100400
- Dialing code: (+39) 011

Tavernette is a frazione (neighbourhood) of Cumiana, in Piedmont, northern Italy.

Its name comes from the latin tabernae (in English tavern or country pub).

== Geography ==
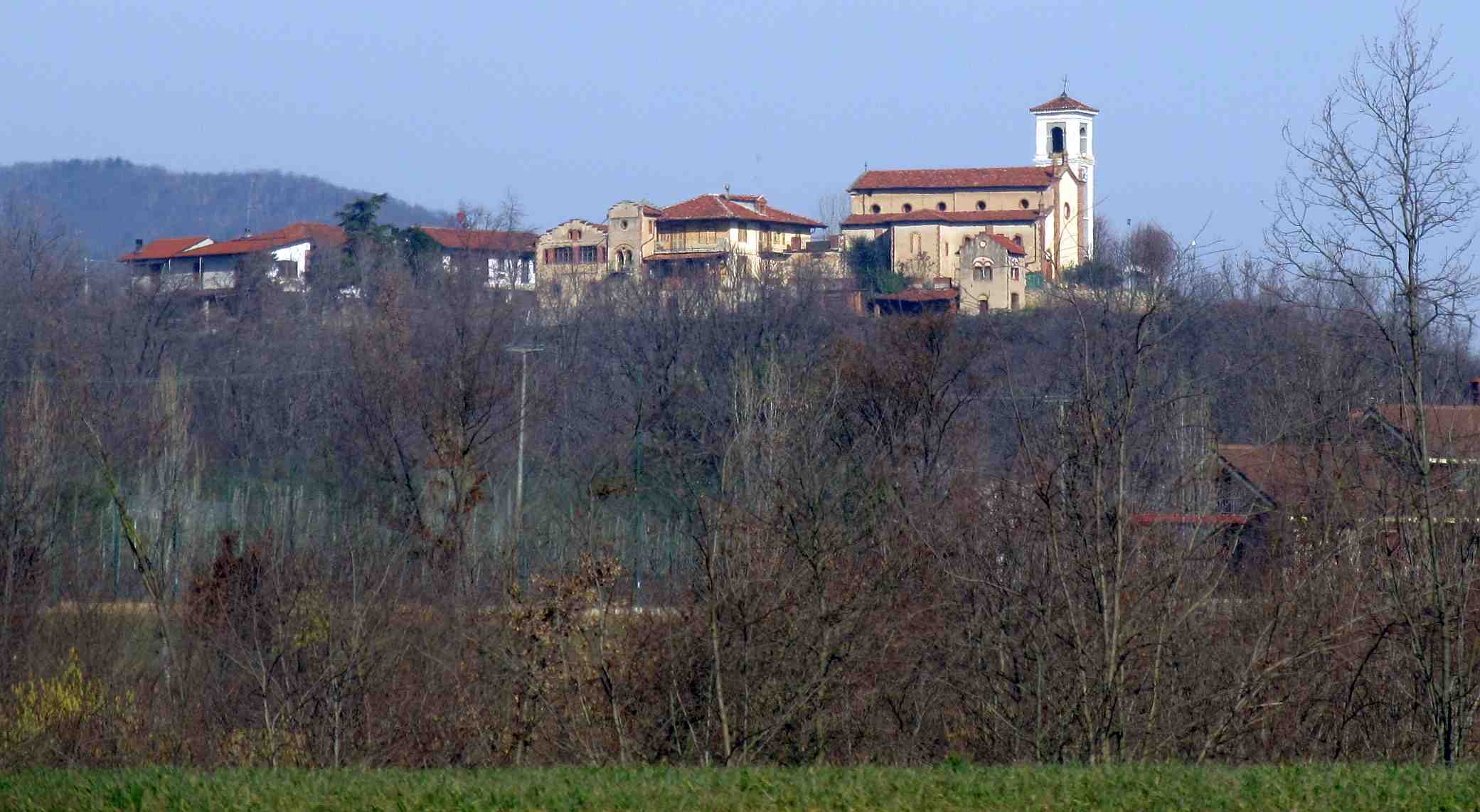
San Pietro in Vincoli parish church

It is a borough located in the Chisola Valley, in the easternmost part of Cottian Alps, some kilometers south-east from the centre of Cumiana. The Monte Tre Denti and Monte Freidour peaks are located nearby.

== History ==
Since 1928 Tavernette was a separate comune (municipality); before 1801 it also encompassed the present-day municipality of Piscina, located in the Po plain.
