= Cumiana =

- Comune
- Comune di Cumiana
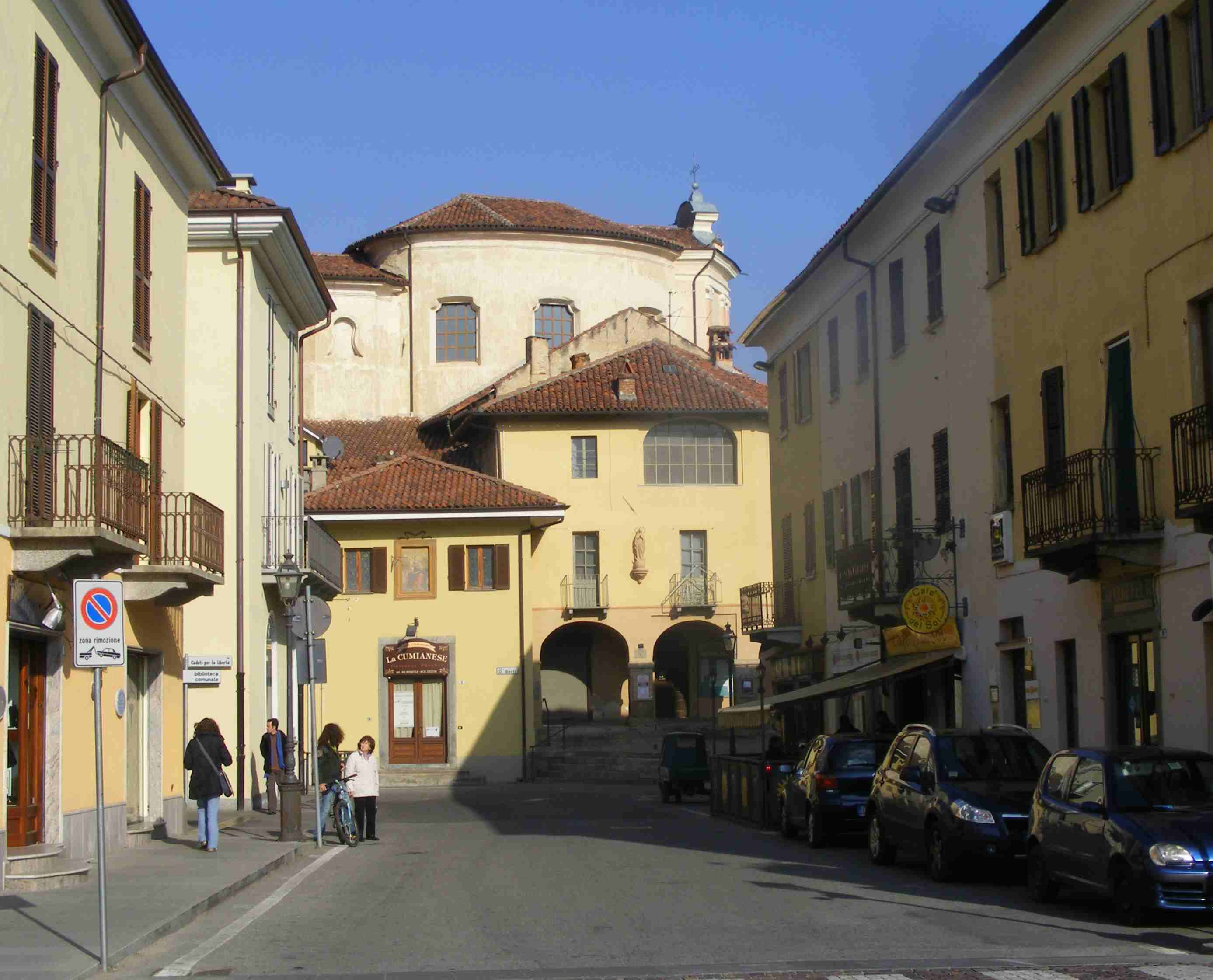

- Coat of arms

- Location within Italy Location within Piedmont
- Coordinates: 44°59′N 7°22′E
- Country: Italy
- Region: Piedmont
- Metropolitan city: Turin (TO)

Government
  - Mayor: Paolo Poggio

Area
  - Total: 60.8 km^{2} (23.5 sq mi)
- Elevation: 377 m (1,237 ft)

Population (30 November 2017)
  - Total: 7,869
  - Density: 129/km^{2} (335/sq mi)
- Demonym: Cumianesi
- Time zone: UTC+1 (CET)
  - Summer (DST): UTC+2 (CEST)
- Postal code: 10040
- Dialing code: 011
- Patron saint: Mary the Child
- Saint day: September 8
- Website: Official website

Cumiana is a comune (municipality) in the Metropolitan City of Turin in the Italian region Piedmont, located about 30 kilometres (19 mi) southwest of Turin.

Cumiana borders the following municipalities: Giaveno, Trana, Piossasco, Pinasca, Volvera, Pinerolo, Frossasco, Cantalupa, Airasca, and Piscina. Mountains nearby Cumiana include the Monte Tre Denti and Monte Freidour, parts of the Cottian Alps.

== Twin towns – sister cities ==
Cumiana is twinned with:

- San Guillermo, Argentina
- Erlangen, Germany

== See also ==
- Tavernette
- Zoom di Cumiana
