= Piscina, Piedmont =

Piscina
- Comune
- Comune di Piscina
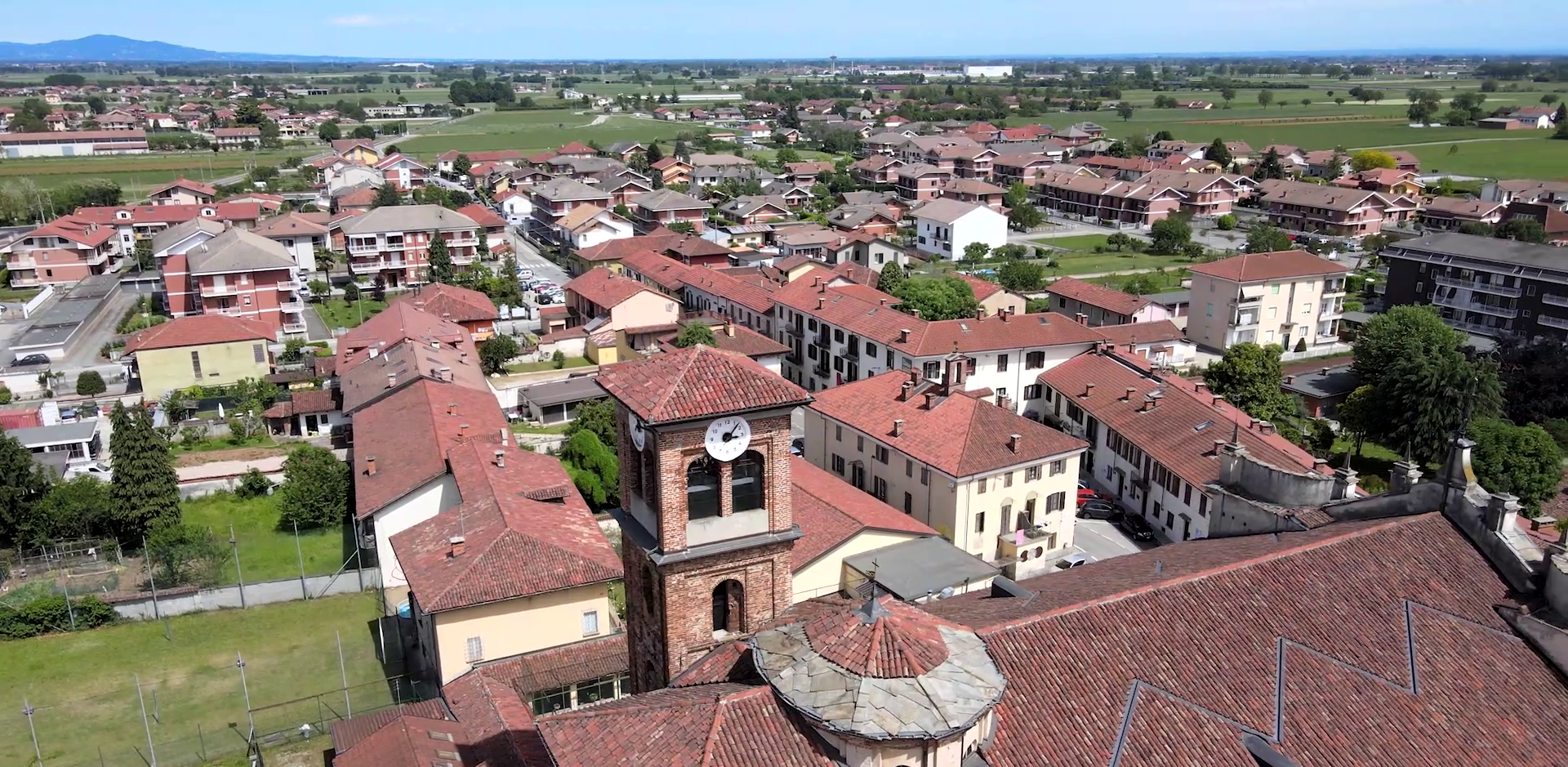

- Coat of arms

- Location within Italy Location within Piedmont
- Coordinates: 44°55′N 7°26′E
- Country: Italy
- Region: Piedmont
- Metropolitan city: Turin (TO)
- Frazioni: Baudi, Bruera, Calvetti, Casevecchie, Crotti, Gabellieri, Gastaldi, Martini

Government
  - Mayor: Enrico Ceresole

Area
  - Total: 9.9 km^{2} (3.8 sq mi)
- Elevation: 288 m (945 ft)

Population (31 December 2010)
  - Total: 3,435
  - Density: 350/km^{2} (900/sq mi)
- Demonym: Piscinesi
- Time zone: UTC+1 (CET)
  - Summer (DST): UTC+2 (CEST)
- Postal code: 10060
- Dialing code: 0121
- Website: Official website

Piscina is a comune (municipality) in the Metropolitan City of Turin in the Italian region Piedmont, located about 25 km southwest of Turin.

Piscina borders the following municipalities: Cumiana, Pinerolo, Frossasco, Airasca, and Scalenghe. Part of the municipal territory was involved in the Battle of Marsaglia in 1693.

== Main sights ==
- Baroque parish church of St. Gratus (18th century), designed by Giuseppe Gerolamo Buniva
- Communal Wing (1699)
- Chapel of St. Roch (16th century)
- Museum of Peasant Art

== Twin towns ==
- Suardi, Argentina, since 2006

== See also ==
- Tavernette
