= Roletto =

- Comune
- Comune di Roletto
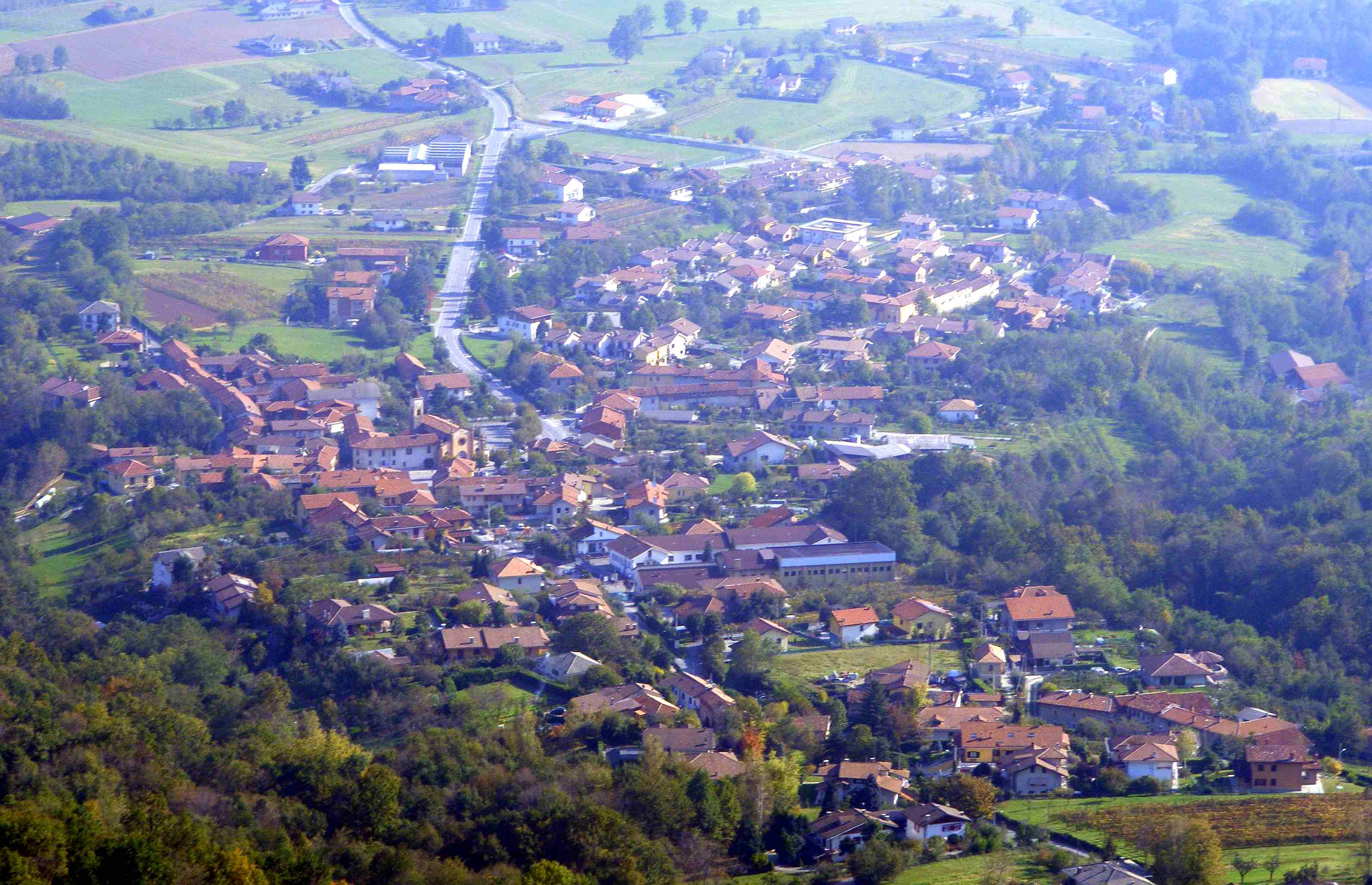

- Location within Italy Location within Piedmont
- Coordinates: 44°55′N 7°20′E
- Country: Italy
- Region: Piedmont
- Metropolitan city: Turin (TO)

Area
  - Total: 9.8 km^{2} (3.8 sq mi)

Population (Dec. 2004)
  - Total: 2,019
  - Density: 210/km^{2} (530/sq mi)
- Demonym: Rolettesi
- Time zone: UTC+1 (CET)
  - Summer (DST): UTC+2 (CEST)
- Postal code: 10060
- Dialing code: 0121

Roletto is a comune (municipality) of the Metropolitan City of Turin in the Italian region Piedmont, located about 35 kilometres (22 mi) southwest of Turin. As of 31 December 2004, it had a population of 2,019 and an area of 9.8 square kilometres (3.8 mi^{2}).

Roletto borders the following municipalities: Pinerolo, Frossasco, and Cantalupa.

== Demographic evolution ==
Historical population

Year	Pop.	±%
1861	961	—
1871	999	+4.0%
1881	1,069	+7.0%
1901	932	−12.8%
1911	891	−4.4%

Year	Pop.	±%
1921	971	+9.0%
1931	853	−12.2%
1936	814	−4.6%
1951	831	+2.1%
1961	777	−6.5%

Year	Pop.	±%
1971	845	+8.8%
1981	1,350	+59.8%
1991	1,708	+26.5%
2001	1,994	+16.7%

Source: Data from ISTAT
