= Abbadia Alpina =

Former commune of the Province of Turin, Italy

Coordinates: 44°53′00″N 7°18′16″E

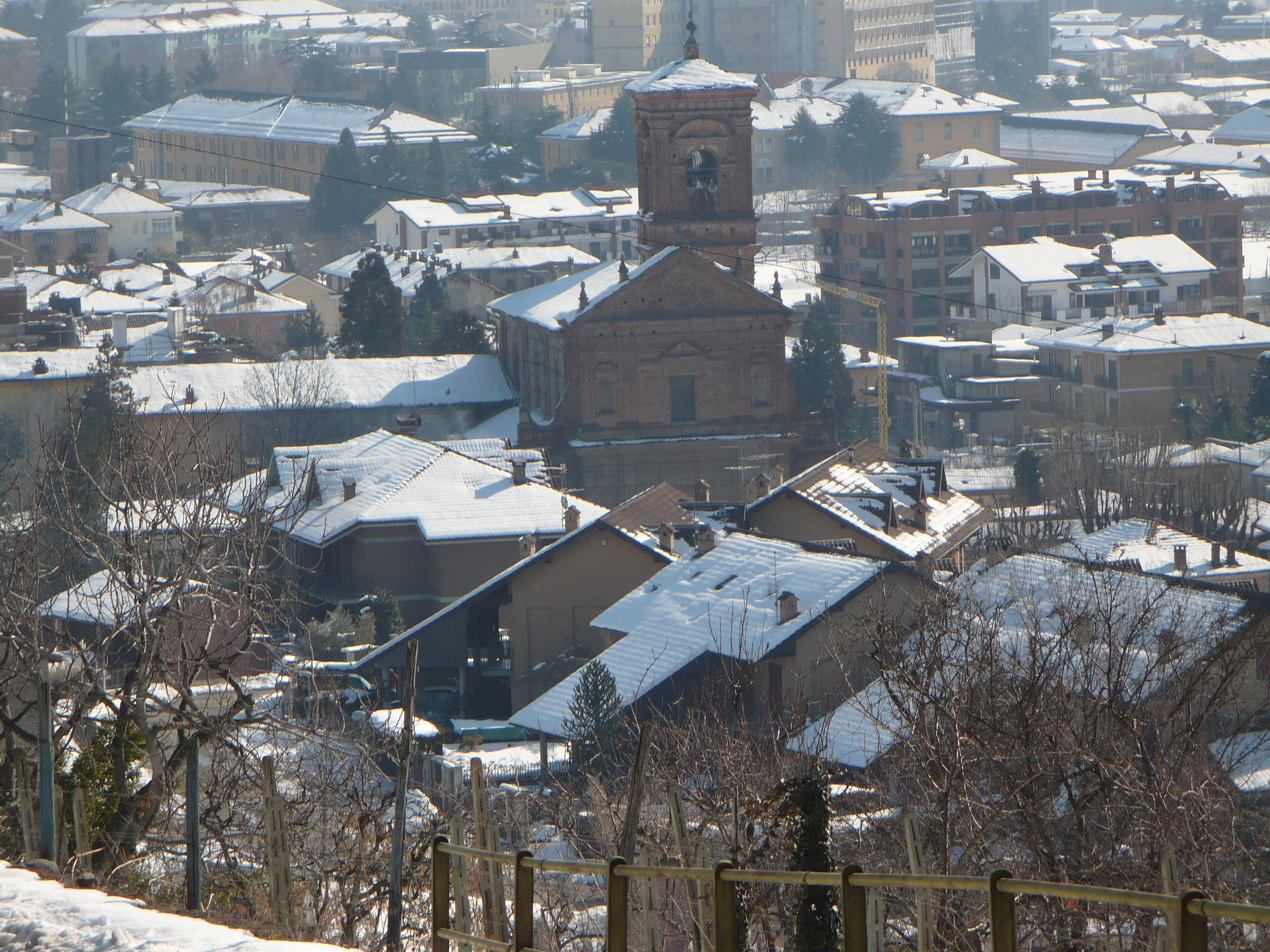

Abbadia Alpina (formerly Abadia); Piedmontese: La Badia Occitan: L'Abaia) is a former commune of the Province of Turin in north-west Italy's Piedmont region, located between the torrents (intermittent streams) Lemina and Cusone.

Before 1864, it was named Abbadia.

Annexed in 1928 to Pinerolo, it is now considered a frazione (civil parish) of that commune.

== Administrative divisions ==
Abbadia Alpina comprises five borghi (neighborhoods):

- Santa Maria = San Verano, the historical center of the church and former town hall until 1928.
- La Madonnina
- Riaglietto = San Martino, the western industrial side.
- La Costera = the hillside, with woods.
- Il Bersaglio = stretching to the coasts.

== Abbey ==
The Benedictine monastery of Santa Maria ad Abbadia Alpina was founded in 1064 by Adelaide, Princess of Susa. In 1078, the Territorial Abbacy nullius of Santa Maria ad Abbadia Alpina was established. It vested in its abbot the privileges of a diocesan prelate: that is, territoriality was not assigned to a bishopric. Instead, the abbey was directly subject to the Holy See. From 1443, its residential ('claustral') abbots were replaced by commendatory abbots, often secular, mainly interested in cashing the abbey's proceeds and earnings.

On December 23, 1748, it lost territory in order to establish the Diocese of Pinerolo (alongside part of its metropolitan area, the Archbishopric of Turin).

In 1805 it was suppressed. Its remaining territory was merged (as was the former bishopric of Pinerolo) into the Diocese of Saluzzo, according to the wishes of the French emperor Napoleon I Bonaparte.

=== Residential abbots ===
- Immenso (1064-1073), probably on site before the countess donated the land for the abbey
- Arnolfo (1073-1078) who in 1074 obtained exemption under Pope Gregory VII
- Arduino (1078-1095), to whom Adelaide di Susa gave total control of the court of Pinerolo, which remained under the abbey until 1243
- Umberto (1095-1115)
- Oddone (1115-1123)
- Dalmorro (1123-1140)
- Gerardo (1140-1170)
- Focardo (1170-1189)
- Guglielmo I (1189-1195)
- Aicardo (1195-1199)
- Pietro I (1199-1202)
- Beltramo (1202-1212)
- Giovanni di Borbone (1212-1226)
- Guglielmo d'Artengo (1226-1238)
- Gerardo II (1238-1239)
- Albuino (1239-1248), excommunicated by the Pope for ceding the town and court of Pinerolo in 1243 to Count Tommaso II di Savoia.
- Ardizzone (1248-1268)
- Annone (1268-1278)
- Balangero dei Bersatori (1278-1310)
- Francesco di San Giulio (1310-1337)
- Gerardo della Balma (1337-1346)
- Andica Falcosini di Trana (1346-1375)
- Guido di Reano (1375-1381)
- Giuliano (1381-1392)
- Enrico di Piossasco (1392-1399)
- Giovanni Cacherano di Bricherasio (1399-1400)
- Luigi Ponte d'Asti (1400-1404)
- Michele Cacherano di Bricherasio (1404-1433), who bought from the community of Italy the bealera d'l Chison for the mills of Abbadia and was nicknamed the second founder of the Abbey

=== Commendatory abbots ===
- Ugone di Lusignano (1433-1442)
- Lancillotto di Lusignano (1442-1491)
- Tommaso de Sur (1491-1496)
- Urbano Bonivardo (1496-1499), who reconsecrated the churches of San Maurizio and San Donato in Pinerolo. His tombstone lies in the parish church of San Verano
- Giovanni Amedeo Bonivardo (1499-1515)
- Giovanni di Savoia (1515-1522), who took care of the abbey by making a long pastoral visit to all the parishes. His tomb lies inside the parish church of San Verano
- Pierre de la Baume (1522-1544), bishop of Geneva
- Giacomo di Savoia-Romont (1544-1567)
- Marcantonio Bobba (1567-1575)
- Filippo Gnostavillani (1575-1582)
- Guido Ferraro (1582-1589)
- Vincenzo Lauro (1589-1590), cardinal of Mondovì, under which the black Benedictine monks were replaced by the Cistercensi Fogliesi with a white dress
- Ruggero Tritonio (1590-1606)
- Scipione Borghese (1606-1634)
- Gianfrancesco d'Agliè (1634-1644)
- Michelangelo Broglia (1644-1677)
- Giuseppe Giacinto Broglia (1677-1721) under whom the abbey was sacked by the French in 1693. This forced the monks to bring in the abbey of Santa Maria di Staffarda the documents of the abbatial archive captured from the French militia, which had burnt them in large numbers.

== See also ==
- List of Catholic dioceses in Italy
