= Chisola =

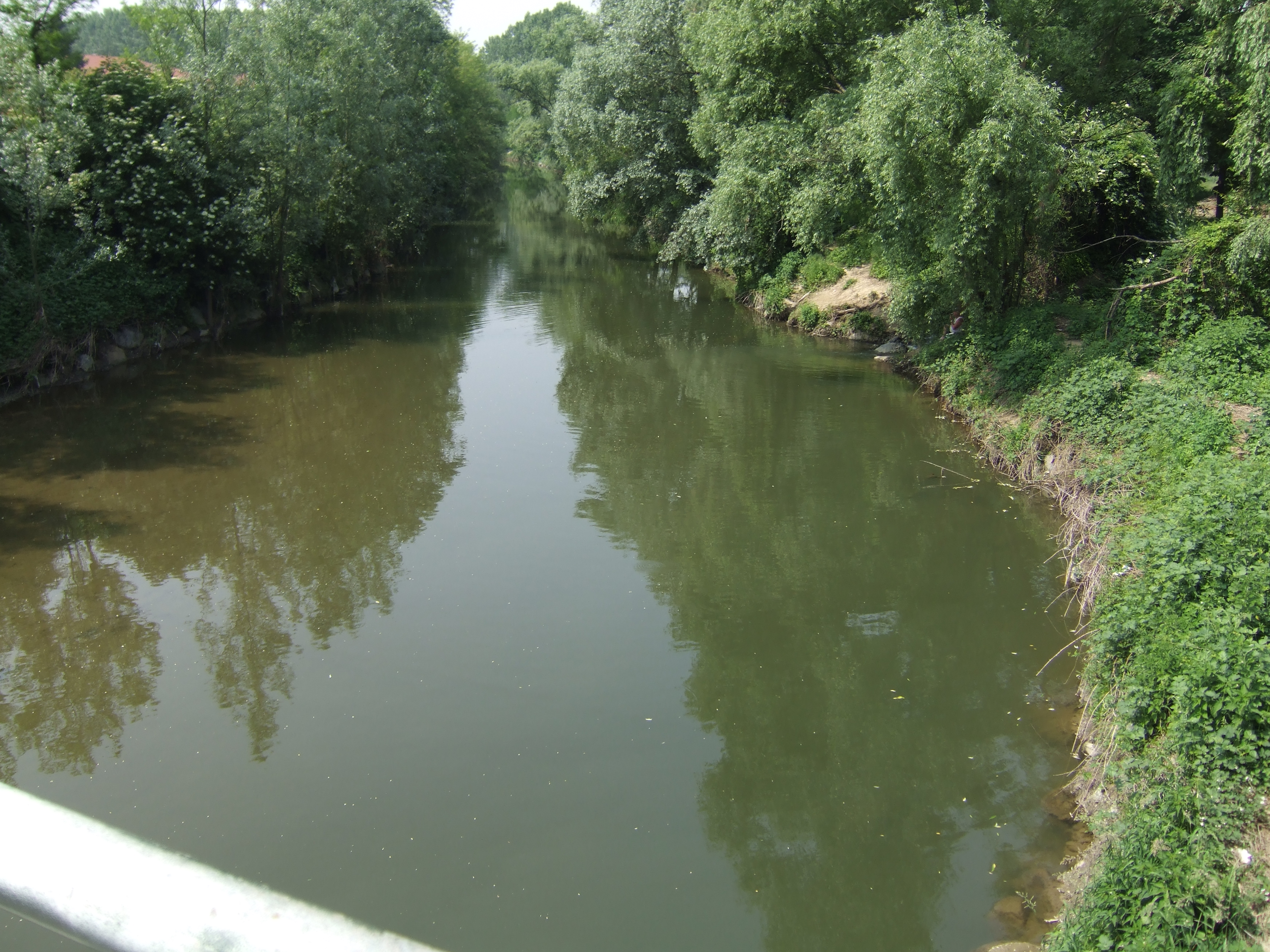
- Chisola near Volvera.

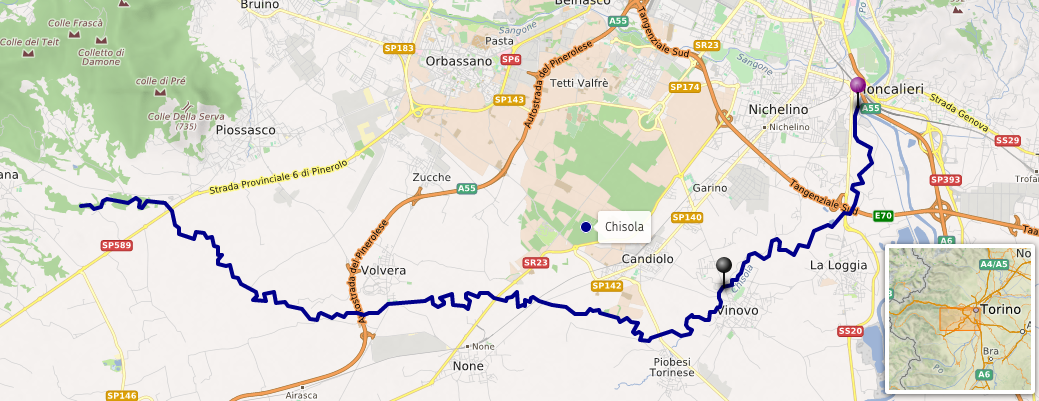
- OSM map

Location
- Country: Italy

Physical characteristics
- Source
  - location: Monte Tre Denti and Monte Freidour
  - elevation: about 1,250 m (4,100 ft)
- Mouth
  - location: Po at Moncalieri
  - coordinates: 44°59′42″N 7°40′25″E
- Length: 39.4 km (24.5 mi)
- Basin size: 536.89 km^{2} (207.29 mi^{2})
- Discharge
  - average: 9.6 m^{3}/s (340 cu ft/s)

Basin features
- Progression: Po→ Adriatic Sea
- Tributaries
  - right: Lemina

Chisola is a torrent in Piedmont, north-western Italy.

== Geography ==
Chisola source is at c. 1,250 m, at the merge of two separate torrent-like branches coming from Monte Tre Denti (1,445 m) and Monte Brunello/Monte Freidour (1,343 m).

The torrent flows entirely in the territory of the Metropolitan City of Turin. After receiving the waters of several torrents and rivers such as the Lemina, Noce and Rio Torto, it flows in the Po River in the Padan Plain, in the territory of Moncalieri, south-west to Turin.
