= Diocese of Pinerolo =

Roman Catholic diocese in Italy

Coordinates: 44.8857°N 7.3298°E

Diocese of Pinerolo Dioecesis Pineroliensis

Catholic
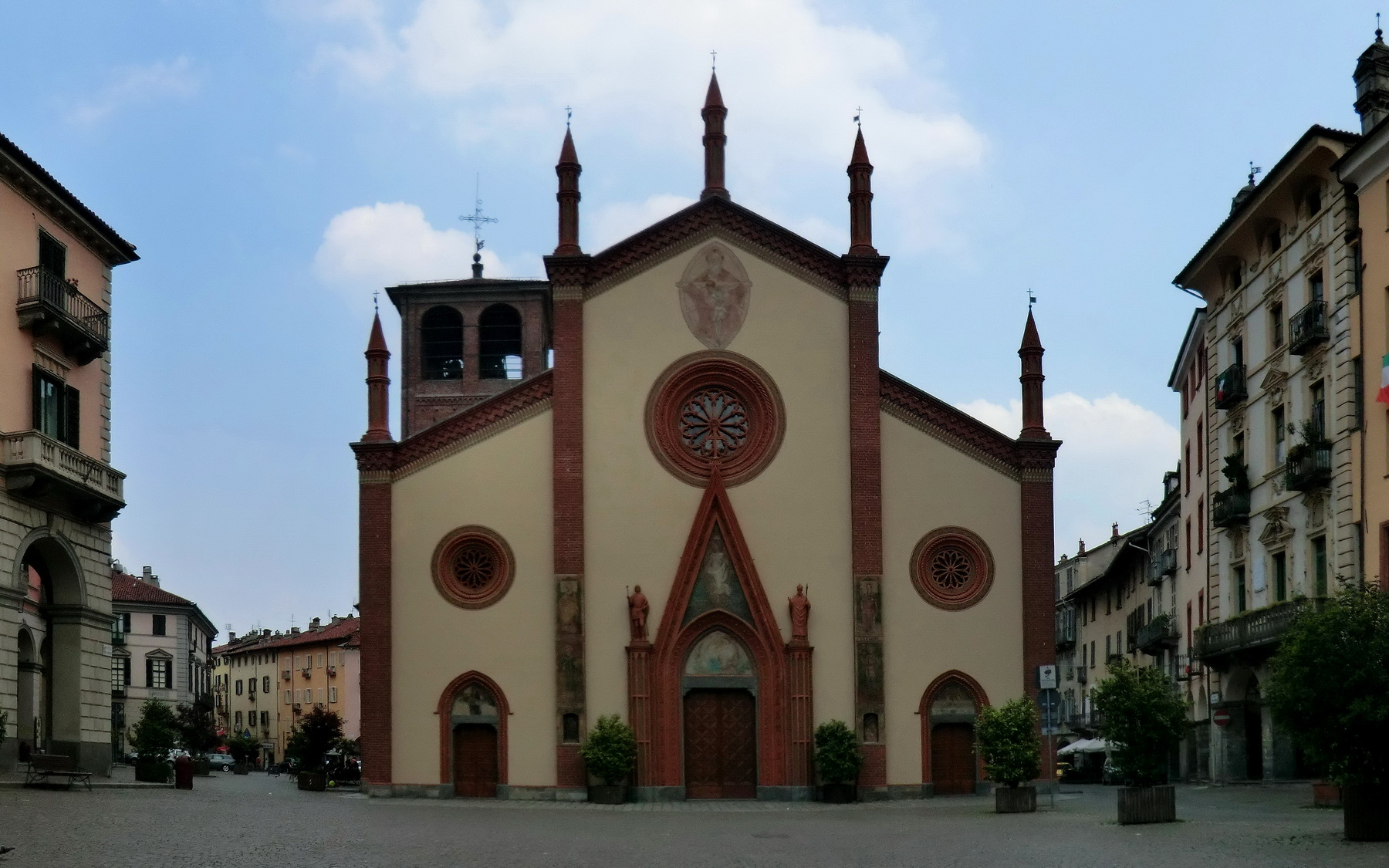
- Pinerolo Cathedral

Location
- Country: Italy
- Ecclesiastical province: Turin

Statistics
- Area: 1,440 km^{2} (560 sq mi)
- Population: Total; Catholics: (as of 2021); 95,700 (est.); 77,950 (guess)
- Parishes: 62

Information
- Denomination: Catholic
- Sui iuris church: Latin Church
- Rite: Roman Rite
- Established: 23 December 1748
- Cathedral: Cattedrale di S. Donato
- Secular priests: 56 (diocesan); 23 (Religious Orders); 15 Permanent Deacons

Current leadership
- Pope: Leo XIV
- Bishop: Derio Olivero
- Bishops emeritus: Piergiorgio Debernardi

Map

Website
- diocesipinerolo.it

The Diocese of Pinerolo (Latin: Dioecesis Pineroliensis) is a Latin diocese of the Catholic Church in the administrative province of Turin of Piedmont region, Northwestern Italy. It is a suffragan of the Metropolitan archbishopric of Turin.

The bishop's seat is in the Cattedrale di S. Donato in Pinerolo, which dates from the 9th century, and has an architecturally significant campanile. The city also has a former cathedral, now called the Chiesa San Verano ad Abbadia Alpina, It also has a minor basilica, the Basilica of San Maurizio, a Gothic church.

== History ==
=== French conquest ===
The ambitions of King Francis I of France with regard to the succession to the Duchy of Milan brought warfare into Savoy and Piedmont. The Emperor Charles V was likewise determined to retain the Duchy of Milan, and his strategy involved the occupation of Provence, making the mountain passes of Savoy of great military importance. This was especially the case at the end of the 17th century with the Duke of Savoy's fortress of Fenestrelle. French troops invaded Piedmont in 1536, and Pinerolo was conquered. The city and the diocese remained under French control until 1574. Louis XIII and Cardinal Richelieu launched a major campaign early in 1629, with the succession to the Duchy of Mantua as the pretext. They spent the Spring of 1629 in Susa, conducting a siege of Pinerolo, but, as it happened, the King fell deathly ill and had to withdraw. In 1630, at the end of the siege, Louis XIII promised the Abbot of Pinerolo that he would outlaw the Waldensian cult, and that he would use his influence with the Vatican to have Pinerolo made a bishopric. Pinerolo was officially handed over to France in 1631 with the treaty of Cherasco, which recognized Victor Amadeus I as the new Duke of Savoy, and was not freed until 1696.

In October 1685 King Louis XIV issued the Edict of Fontainebleau, which cancelled the privileges which had been granted to the Protestants in the Edict of Nantes. On 12 October 1685 the King sent instructions to his ambassador in Turin, the Marquis d'Arcy, to issue the appropriate orders to the Seigneur d'Harleville, the royal agent in Pinerolo, to engage in efforts to convert the inhabitants of the nine valleys in which the Waldensians were permitted to live. The ambassador was also to encourage the Duke of Savoy, the protector of the Waldensians, to the same purpose. Pinerolo thus became the center of efforts at conversion.

Victor Amadeus II, Duke of Savoy, Marquis of Saluzzo, Duke of Montferrat, Prince of Piedmont, Count of Aosta, Moriana and Nice, was recognized as King of Sardinia in 1720.

In 1743, Carlo Emanuele III established in Pinerolo the Ospizio dei Catecumeni, an institute for those who were converting to the Catholic faith. By decree of the French Republic of 29 January 1799, the institution was suppressed and converted into a charity hospital. It was reestablished after the overthrow of the French, though as the 19th century progressed, increasingly liberal attitudes directed the institution more and more in the direction of charity and less in that of catechetization.

=== Creation of the diocese ===
The diocese of Pinerolo was established by Pope Benedict XIV on 23 December 1748, by the bull In sacrosancta, at the request of King Charles Emmanuel III of Sardinia, on Piemontese territories split off from its Metropolitan, the Archdiocese of Torino.

This included territory from the suppressed Abbacy nullius of Santa Maria ad Abbadia Alpina. It was founded in 1064 by Adelaide, Princess of Susa, in Abbadia Alpina, less than two miles west of Pinerolo, which was part of the Marca di Torino (March of Turin). The lands belonging to the abbey were governed by the abbots of Pinerolo, even after the city had established itself as a commune (1200). From 1235, however, Amadeus IV, Count of Savoy exercised over the town a kind of protectorate, which in 1243 became absolute, and was exercised thereafter by the house of Savoy.

In creating the diocese, Pope Benedict XIV noted that the King of Sardinia had ceded to the new diocese his rights over the monastery of Oulx, and had given the palace of the Governor in Pinerolo to be used as the episcopal residence and seminary. The new bishop, Giovanni Battista D'Orlié, however, judged that the palace was not appropriate for a seminary. In 1753 the new diocese received the bequest of his palazzo in Pinerolo from Count Luigi Piccone, the former Governor of Pinerolo and of the city and province of Asti. The bishop was able to preside over the solemn opening of the new seminary on 23 May 1753.

The Chapter of the Collegiate Churches of S. Donato and of S. Maurizio was founded perhaps as early as 1024, and it was certainly functioning as a single body by 1278. They were certainly secular canons by the 14th century, though some have argued that they were originally regular canons. There were four canons and a provost. In a document of 1475 it is made clear that they did not live in common, but had separate residences (domus canonicales). By 1626 the number of canons was seven, and by 1648 the number had risen to twelve. At the time of the creation of the diocese in 1748, there were eighteen canons.

At the time the diocese was erected there were already working in its territory, in addition to the diocesan clergy of Turin, eight Dominican Order priests, twelve Franciscan priests, five Augustinian priests, six Jesuit priests, and eighteen Capuchin priests. There were eighteen professed nuns of the Visitation, thirty-six Clarisses, and twenty-five Augustinian nuns. The Society of Jesus (Jesuits) was suppressed by Pope Clement XIV on 21 July 1773.

=== French revolution ===
In 1796 Piedmont was seized by the armies of the French Directory, the King driven into exile in Sardinia, and a Republic of Piedmont was declared. By a decree of 12 April 1801, the First Consul of the French Republic, N. Bonaparte, declared the Republic of Piedmont united to the French state, and divided it into six departements. The decree also made the French language obligatory. Pinerolo became part of the Department of Eridanus, and four Administrators General of the department were named; Pinerolo received a Sub-Prefect, who held office until the Bourbon Restoration in 1814. By a decree of 31 August 1802, religious corporations were abolished, and the Augustinians, the Capuchins, the Clarisses, and the Feuillants were expelled. The Salesian Sisters had already been ordered from their monastery in 1799. The Badia of Santa Maria was closed, and the church of San Francesco, which was in bad condition, was sold at public auction in 1802, and razed to the ground; its tombs, including that of Duke Carlo I of Savoy, were despoiled. On 11 September 1803 a Senatus Consultum made the annexation of Piedmont to the French state permanent.

Following the Concordat of 1801 between Bonaparte and Pope Pius VII, the Pope issued a bull, Gravissimis causis (1 June 1803), in which the number of dioceses in Piedmont was reduced to eight: Turin, Vercelli, Ivrea, Acqui, Asti, Mondovi, Alessandria and Saluzzo. In 1805, by an imperial decree of the Emperor of the French, Napoleon I Bonaparte, the papal bull was put into effect and the diocese of Pinerolo was suppressed, and its territory merged into the diocese of Saluzzo.

On 2 April 1808 two major earthquakes struck the western Piedmont, with Pinerolo close to the epicenter. More than 400 houses were rendered unlivable. Aftershocks continued for seven months.

=== Restoration ===
After the defeat of Napoleon and the return of Pope Pius VII from his French imprisonment, the Congress of Vienna promoted the restoration of the Kingdom of Sardinia and the Papal States (with some exceptions) to their rightful owners. In both cases the chaos caused by the French occupation had to be undone, and both Victor Emanuel I and Pius VII needed support in asserting their legitimacy and authority. Through Count Giuseppe Barbaroux, the envoy of the King, and Cardinal Enrico Consalvi, the Papal Secretary of State, it was agreed that a reorganization of the Church in the Piedmont was essential. The culmination of negotiations was a bull issued by the Pope on 17 July 1817, Beati Petri, which was promulgated in November, fortified by the royal Exequatur and a decree of the Royal Senate, re-erecting all of the dioceses in the Piedmont and redrawing their diocesan boundaries. In Pinerolo the proclamation was carried out by Pietro Antonio Cirio, Canon of the Cathedral Chapter of Turin and Subdelegatus Apostolicus, on 9 November 1817. An inscribed tablet on the façade of the Cathedral of S. Donato commemorates the event.

On 15 January 1818 Bishop Bigex reopened the Major Seminary, and established a minor seminary which was later converted into the collegio concitto civico.

=== Diocesan synods ===
A diocesan synod was an irregularly held, but important, meeting of the bishop of a diocese and his clergy. Its purpose was (1) to proclaim generally the various decrees already issued by the bishop; (2) to discuss and ratify measures on which the bishop chose to consult with his clergy; (3) to publish statutes and decrees of the diocesan synod, of the provincial synod, and of the Holy See.

The first diocesan synod was held by Bishop d'Orlié on 14—16 September 1762, and dealt with all the usual topics, especially the administration of the sacraments (ordering specially that the Blessed Sacrament be kept at the high altar of each church) and the conduct of the clergy (who were specially forbidden to play the high-stakes gambling card game called bassetta). Sixty-seven synodal examiners were appointed. The statutes of the synod remained in force until 1842.

Bishop François-Marie Bigex held a diocesan synod in Pinerolo in the Cathedral of S. Donato from 21 to 23 September 1819. The participants included the Father Guardian and the Vicar of the Capucins, the only religious order of men which had been re-established at the time. In the last session of the synod, there was unexpected dissension on the part of some of the clergy at the severity of the new canons.

Another synod was held from 21 to 21 September 1842 by Bishop Andreas Charvaz. whose statutes provided an example for the rest of northern Italy of rigor without severity and without excessive indulgence tending toward licence. The conversion of the Waldenses was promoted, and warnings were issued about unauthorized Italian translations of the Bible, containing controversial passages and interpretations. The authority of the pope as supreme pastor in the entire world was defended.

== Bishops of Pinerolo ==
- Giovanni Battista D'Orlié de Saint Innocent, C.R.S.A. (1749–1794)

Sede vacante (1794–1797)

- Giuseppe Maria Grimaldi (1797–1803)

Teresio Ferreri della Marmora (1805–1817)

- François-Marie Bigex (born Savoy) (1817–1824)
- Pierre-Joseph Rey (1824–1832)
- Andreas Charvaz (1834–1848)
- Lorenzo Guglielmo Maria Renaldi (1849–1873)
- Giovanni Domenico Vassarotti (1873–1881)
- Filippo Chiesa (1881–1886)
- Giovanni Maria Sardi (1886–1894)
- Giovanni Battista Rossi (1894–1922)
- Angelo Bartolomasi (1922–1929)
- Gaudenzio Binaschi (1930.01.20 – retired 1966.09.29), died 1968
  - Apostolic Administrator Bartolomeo Santo Quadri (1968–1972)
  - Apostolic Administrator Massimo Giustetti (1972–1974)
- Massimo Giustetti (21 March 1974 – 17 December 1975)
- Pietro Giachetti (1 May 1976 – retired July 7, 1998)
- Piergiorgio Debernardi (July 7, 1998 – retired July 7, 2017)
- Derio Olivero (July 7, 2017 – ...)

== Statistics and extent ==
In 2021, the Diocese of Pinerolo pastorally served approximately 77,950 Catholics (81.5% of a total population of approximately 95,700) in 62 parishes with 79 priests (56 diocesan, 23 religious), 15 deacons, and 150 lay religious (27 brothers, 192 sisters). On 3 March 2018 the Bishop of Pinerolo ordained two new priests.

=== Parishes ===
The 62 parishes (by municipality) are all within the Piedmontese province of Turin The Diocese of Pinerolo maintains a list of its parishes on its website.

== See also ==
- List of Catholic dioceses in Italy

== Sources ==
=== Reference works ===
- Gams, Pius Bonifatius (1873). Series episcoporum Ecclesiae catholicae: quotquot innotuerunt a beato Petro apostolo. Ratisbon: Typis et Sumptibus Georgii Josephi Manz. p. 821. (in Latin)
- Ritzler, Remigius; Sefrin, Pirminus (1958). Hierarchia catholica medii et recentis aevi VI (1730–1799). Patavii: Messagero di S. Antonio. p. 338. (in Latin)
- Ritzler, Remigius; Sefrin, Pirminus (1968). Hierarchia Catholica medii et recentioris aevi sive summorum pontificum, S. R. E. cardinalium, ecclesiarum antistitum series... A pontificatu Pii PP. VII (1800) usque ad pontificatum Gregorii PP. XVI (1846) (in Latin). Vol. VII. Monasterii: Libr. Regensburgiana.
- Remigius Ritzler; Pirminus Sefrin (1978). Hierarchia catholica Medii et recentioris aevi... A Pontificatu PII PP. IX (1846) usque ad Pontificatum Leonis PP. XIII (1903) (in Latin). Vol. VIII. Il Messaggero di S. Antonio.
- Pięta, Zenon (2002). Hierarchia catholica medii et recentioris aevi... A pontificatu Pii PP. X (1903) usque ad pontificatum Benedictii PP. XV (1922) (in Latin). Vol. IX. Padua: Messagero di San Antonio. ISBN 978-88-250-1000-8.

=== Studies ===
- Bert, Amedeo (1849). I Valdesi, ossiano i christiano-cattolico secondo la chiesa primitiva abitanti le così dette valli di Piemonte (in Italian). Torino: Fiore, Malan.
- Bernardi, Jacopo (1864). Ospizio de' catecumeni in Pinerolo: cenni storici e regolamento (in Italian). Pinerolo: Tipografia di Giuseppe Chiantore.
- Caffaro, Pietro (1893). Notizie e documenti della chiesa pinerolese ... (in Italian). Vol. I. A. Zanetti.
- Caffaro, Pietro (1896). Notizie e documenti della chiesa pinerolese (in Italian). Vol. II, Volume III. Pinerolo: A. Zanetti.
- Caffaro, Pietro (1900). Notizie e documenti della chiesa pinerolese (in Italian). Vol. V. Pinerolo: Chiantore-Mascarelli.
- Cappelletti, Giuseppe (1858). Le chiese d'Italia: dalla loro origine sino ai nostri giorni (in Italian). Vol. decimoquarto (XIV). Venice: G. Antonelli. pp. 287–326.
- Carutti, Domenico Carutti (1897). Storia di Pinerolo (in Italian). Pinerolo: Chiantore-Mascarelli. pp. 577–578.
- Mezzadri, Luigi; Maurizio Tagliaferri; Elio Guerriero (2008). Le diocesi d'Italia (in Italian). Vol. III. Cinisello Balsamo (Milano): San Paolo. pp. 956 ff. ISBN 978-88-215-6172-6.
- Indiocesi, Giornale degli insegnanti di religione della diocesi di Pinerolo ("Indiocesi.it è un giornale locale di ispirazione cattolica, a diffusione gratuita, che si pone come obiettivo di divulgare il pensiero cristiano inerente le tematiche esistenziali e di attualità, in dialogo con altre ispirazioni culturali e religiose.") (in Italian) [appears to have ceased on-line publication in May 2010]
- Diocesi di Pinerolo, Vita diocesana pinerolese; retrieved: 2018-03-12. [diocesan newspaper: Vita S.r.l. Redazione e Amministrazione – Via Vescovado, 1 – 10064 Pinerolo (TO)]
- Benedict XIV (1753). Henri Albert Gosse (ed.). Sanctissimi domini nostri Benedicti Papae XIV Bullarium (in Latin). Luxemburg: sumptibus Henrici-Alberti Gosse. pp. 287–300.
- Pope Benedict XIV (1846). Benedicti XIV. Pont. Opt. Max. opera omnia in tomos XVII. distributa: Bullarium. Opera omnia, Tomus decimus sextus (16) (in Latin). Vol. Tomus II (1746–1748). Prati: Aldina. pp. 462–481.
- Papal bull Beati Petri, in Bullarii Romani Continuatio. Pii VII. continens Pontificatum ab anno XVI usque ad finem (in Latin). Vol. Tomus septimus, Pars II. Prati: Typogr. Aldina. 1852. pp. 1490–1503.
