= None, Piedmont =

None
- Comune
- Comune di None
- None (Italy) - piazza Cavour

- Coat of arms

- Location within Italy Location within Piedmont
- Coordinates: 44°56′N 7°32′E
- Country: Italy
- Region: Piedmont
- Metropolitan city: Turin (TO)

Government
  - Mayor: Enzo Garrone

Area
  - Total: 24.64 km^{2} (9.51 sq mi)
- Elevation: 245 m (804 ft)

Population (30 November 2017)
  - Total: 8,014
  - Density: 325.2/km^{2} (842.4/sq mi)
- Demonym: Nonesi
- Time zone: UTC+1 (CET)
  - Summer (DST): UTC+2 (CEST)
- Postal code: 10060
- Dialing code: 011
- Website: Official website

None is a comune (municipality) in the Metropolitan City of Turin in the Italian region Piedmont, located about 20 kilometres (12 mi) southwest of Turin.

None borders the following municipalities: Orbassano, Volvera, Candiolo, Piobesi Torinese, Airasca, Castagnole Piemonte, and Scalenghe.

== Places of interest ==
- Chiesa della Confraternita dello Spirito Santo e di San Rocco
- Santi Gervasio e Protasio - parish church
- San Rocco - 16th-century church

== Community facilities ==
In the town are a library and a cinema, two kindergartens, two elementary schools and a high school as well as two pharmacies.
