= The Little Animal Farm =

Italian pig sanctuary

The Little Animal Farm (Italian: La Piccola Fattoria degli Animali) is an Italian pig sanctuary located in Airasca, Piedmont. Founded by Federica Trivelli in 2009, the site currently houses 20 pigs across four sties.
