= Lemina =

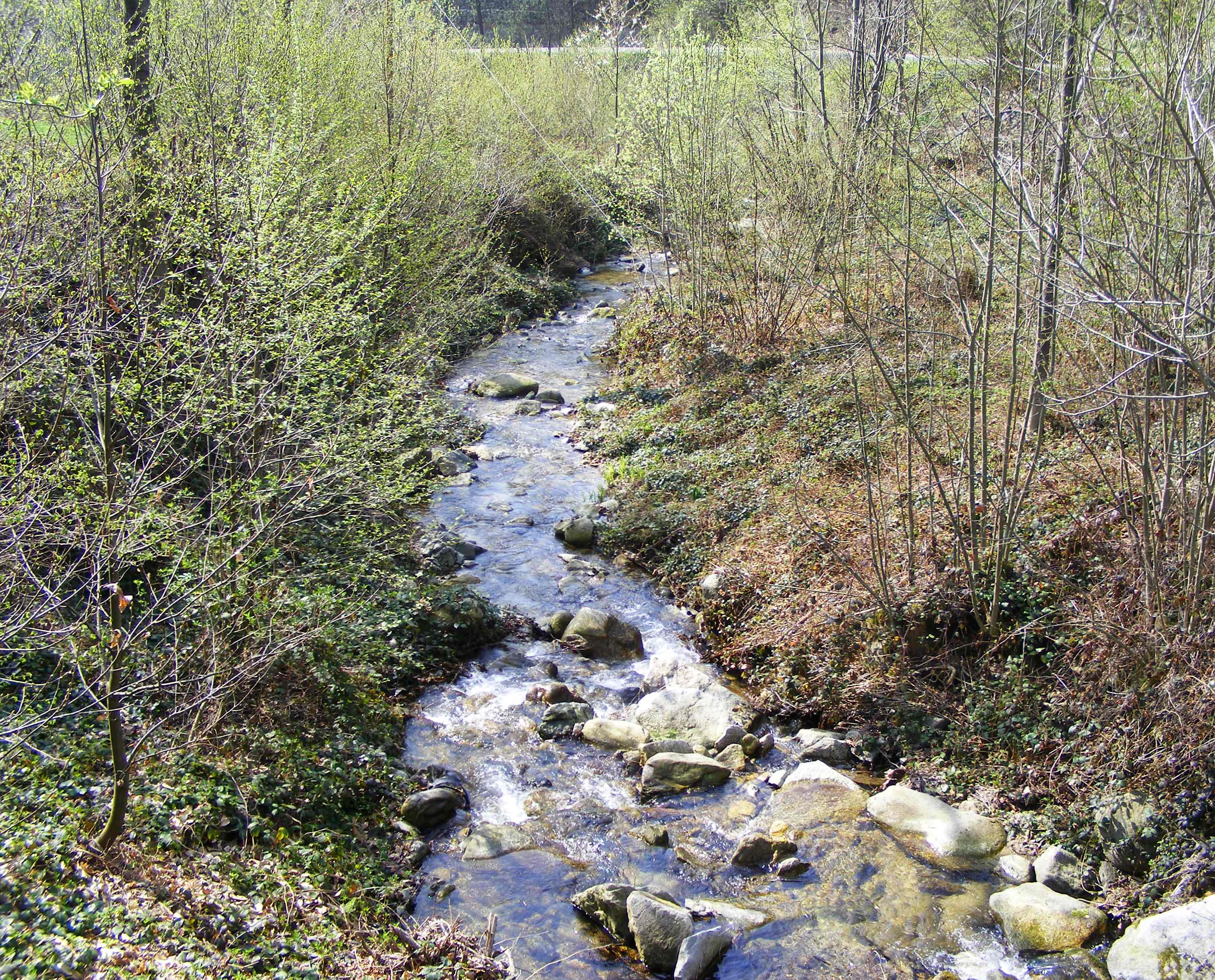
- Lemina after Talucco.

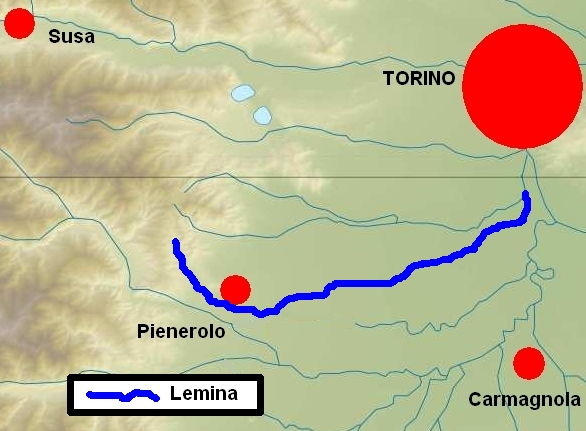
- Location within the province of Turin

Location
- Country: Italy

Physical characteristics
- Source
  - location: Monte Faiè
  - elevation: about 1,300 m (4,300 ft)
- Mouth: Chisola
  - coordinates: 44°57′44″N 7°39′19″E
- Length: 46.1 km (28.6 mi)
- Basin size: 192.88 km^{2} (74.47 mi^{2})
- Discharge
  - average: 3.2 m^{3}/s (110 cu ft/s)

Basin features
- Progression: Chisola→ Po→ Adriatic Sea

Lemina is a torrent in Piedmont, north-western Italy.

== Geography ==
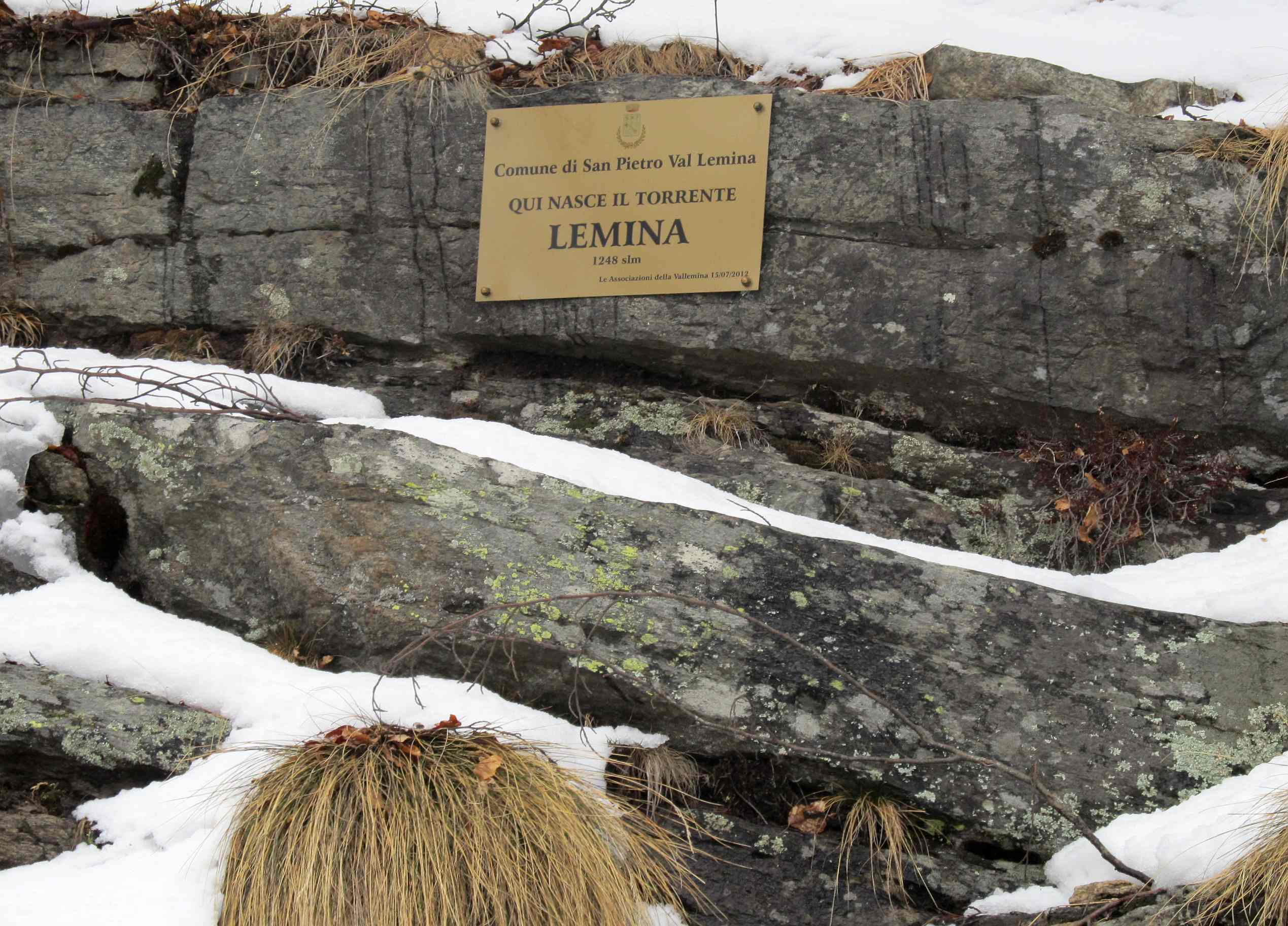
Metal plaque at the source of the Lemina

Lemina source is at 1,382 m above sea level at Monte Faiè, a peak of Monte Freidour in the central Cottian Alps, at the boundary between the communal territories of Pinerolo and San Pietro Val Lemina. It flows for some 46 km, until entering the Chisola near the communes of La Loggia and Vinovo, some kilometers east to Turin.
