= Pinerolo Cathedral =

Cathedral in Pinerolo, Italy

Coordinates: 44.8857°N 7.3298°E

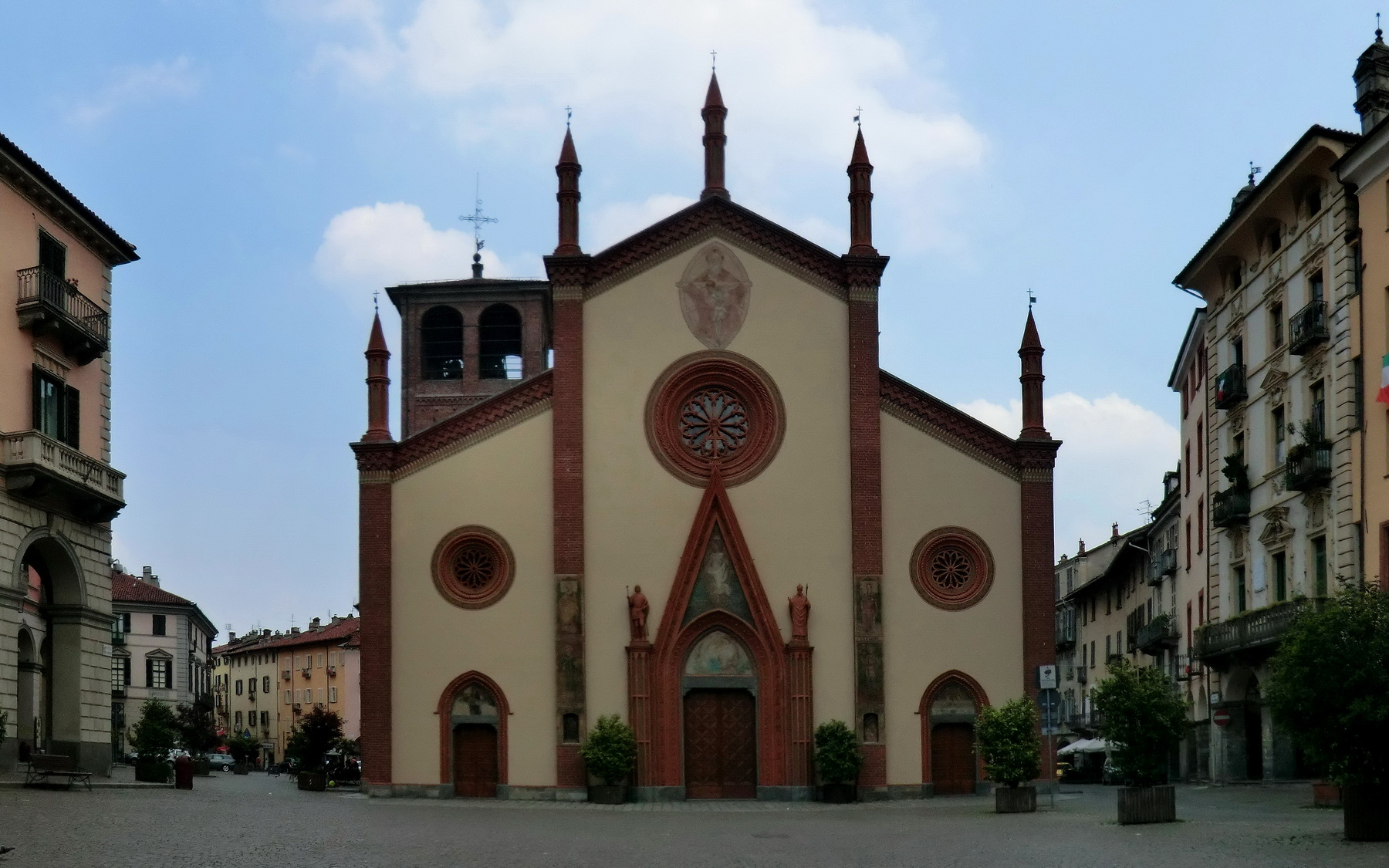
Pinerolo Cathedral

Pinerolo Cathedral (Italian: Duomo di Pinerolo; Cattedrale di San Donato) is a Roman Catholic cathedral in Pinerolo, Piedmont, Italy, dedicated to Saint Donatus of Arezzo.

It is the episcopal seat of the Diocese of Pinerolo.
