= Basilica of San Maurizio, Pinerolo =

Church in Piedmont, Italy

Coordinates: 44.889308°N 7.326703°E

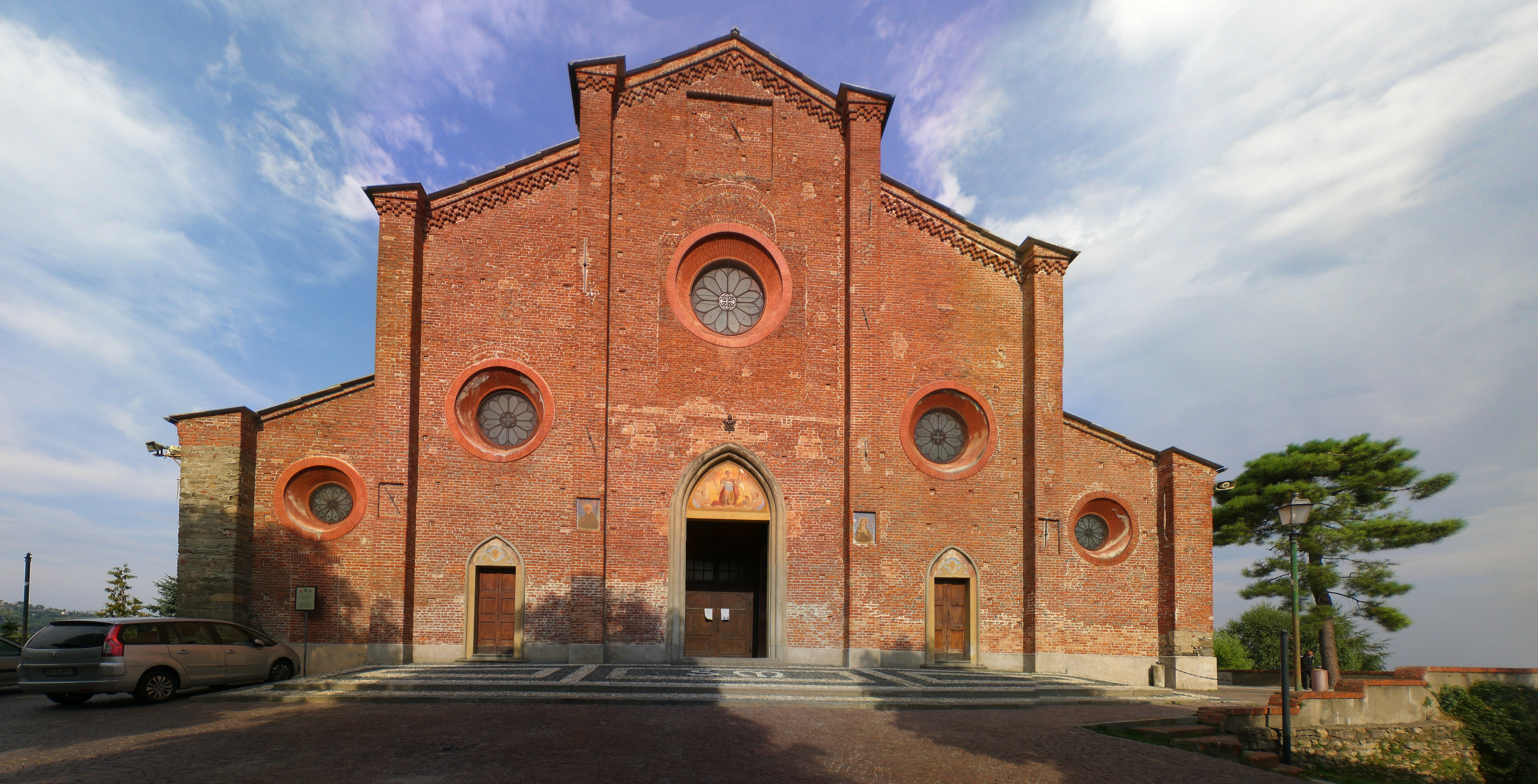
Facade of church

The Minor Basilica of San Maurizio (Italian: Basilica di San Maurizio) is a Roman Catholic church atop a hill overlooking the town of Pinerolo, Province of Turin, Piedmont, Italy.

== History and description ==
A church at the site is documented since 1078, when the bishop of Turin, Cuniberto, acknowledges the donation of this and other churches to a monastery in Pinerolo.

The documents also refer to an arduous major reconstruction starting in the 1440s and completed sometime in the early 17th century, when the nave was finally roofed. The new church was reconsecrated in 1635. Sometime around 1665, damage to the church was caused by lightning strike, but even more dramatic an explosion near the monastery of St Clare in Pinerolo killed 400 townsfolk, who were initially brought to the church awaiting burial. The mass of cadavers led to a closure of the church. In 1691, the church was used to store grain in expectation of a siege of the town. Some damage occurred to the church during a siege two years later.

The bell-tower, dating 1336, was built in a Romanesque style. The interior of the church contains frescoes depicting the Ascension of Christ by Giuseppe Antonio Petrini and the main altarpiece canvas depicting the Birth of the Virgin by Claudio Francesco Beaumont. The church was again restored in 1897, including frescoes by Gabriele Ferrero. The church has numerous side chapels. It was raised to a minor basilica in 2002.
