= San Rocco, None =

Church in Piedmont, Italy

Church of Saint Roch
- Chiesa di San Rocco (Italian)
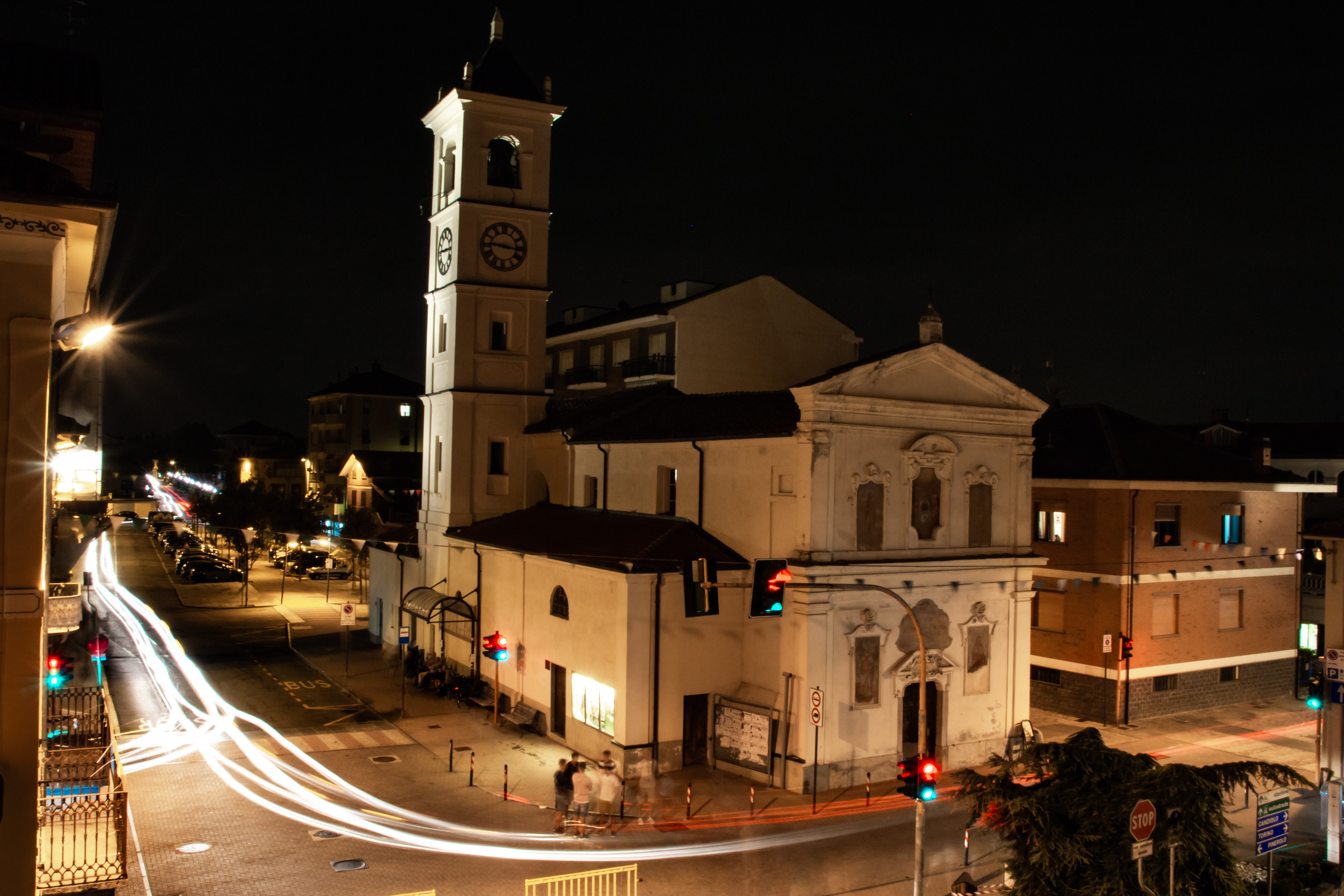
- The church with its bell tower at night.
- Church of Saint Roch
- 44°56′01.1″N 7°32′27.3″E
- Location: None, Region of Piedmont
- Country: Italy
- Denomination: Roman Catholic

History
- Status: Church
- Founded: 1522
- Dedication: Saint Roch

Architecture
- Functional status: Active
- Style: Renaissance

Administration
- Province: Turin
- Archdiocese: Turin

The Church of Saint Roch (Italian: Chiesa di San Rocco) is a Renaissance-style Roman Catholic church dedicated to Saint Roch in None, Region of Piedmont, Italy.

A church at the site was initially documented by 1522, but occupied by 1589 by the Company of the Disciplinati, also known as the Batù di San Rocco. In the past, this was a flagellant confraternity, but over the centuries it was less rigorous, and included both men and women. During processions at different festivals, the men are dressed in white, and the women, in yellow. The feast ending Pentecost was dedicated to Saint Roch. The facade was erected in 1710. The bell-tower with clocks was built in 1739.

== See also ==
- Santi Gervasio e Protasio, None
