= Cantalupa =

- Comune
- Comune di Cantalupa
- Coat of arms

- Location of Cantalupa in Italy Cantalupa (Piedmont)
- Coordinates: 44°56′N 7°20′E
- Country: Italy
- Region: Piedmont
- Metropolitan city: Turin (TO)

Government
  - Mayor: Giustino Bello

Area
  - Total: 11.20 km^{2} (4.32 sq mi)
- Elevation: 459 m (1,506 ft)

Population (1-1-2017)
  - Total: 2,561
  - Density: 228.7/km^{2} (592.2/sq mi)
- Demonym: Cantalupese(i)
- Time zone: UTC+1 (CET)
  - Summer (DST): UTC+2 (CEST)
- Postal code: 10060
- Dialing code: 0121
- Website: Official website

Cantalupa is a comune (municipality) in the Metropolitan City of Turin in the Italian region Piedmont, located about 30 kilometres (19 mi) southwest of Turin, at the foot of Monte Freidour.

Cantalupa borders the following municipalities: Cumiana, Frossasco, and Roletto.

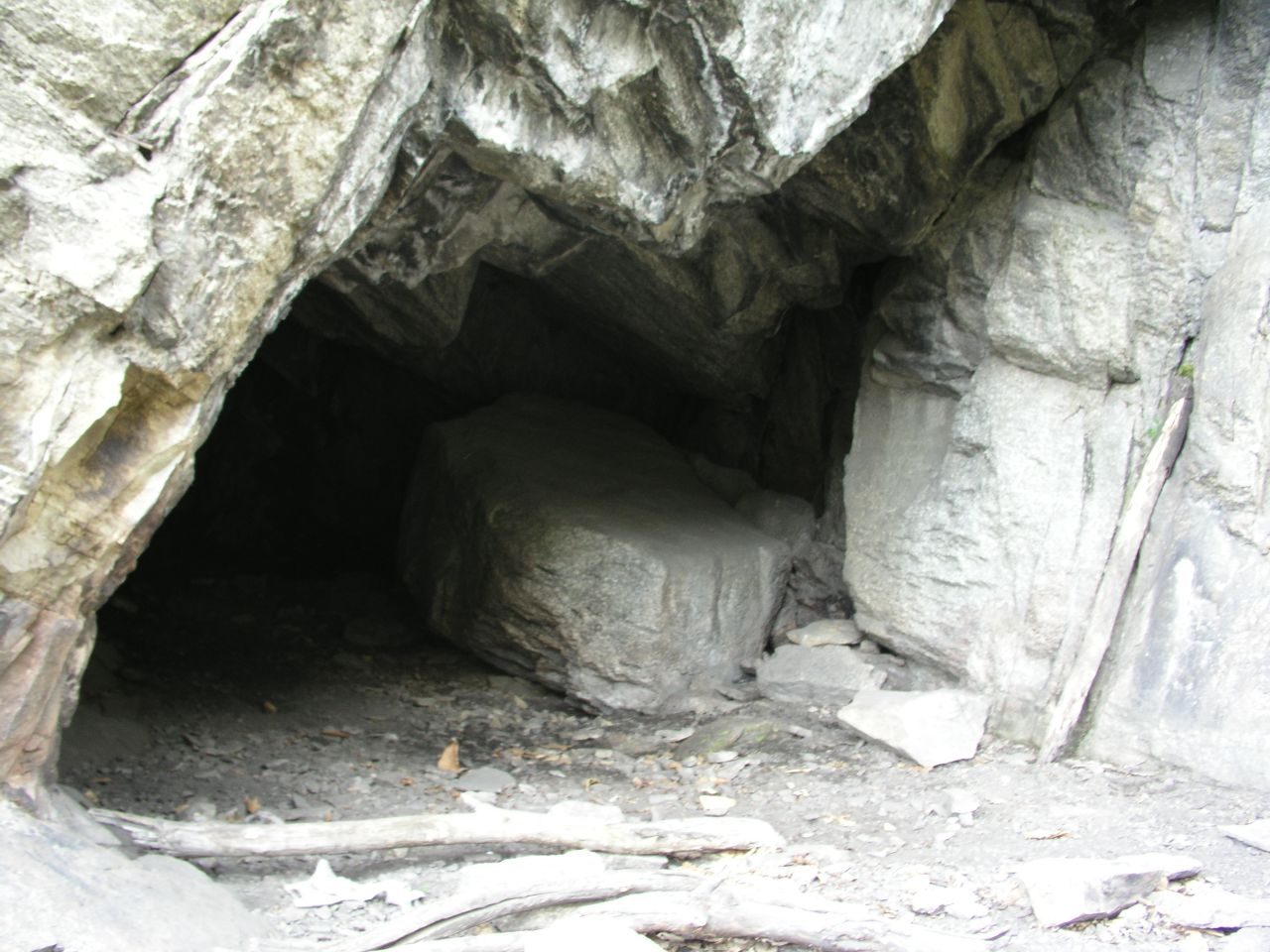
Ciumiera Cave. Nearby Iron Age remains were found.
