= Zoom Torino =

Zoo and amusement park in Italy

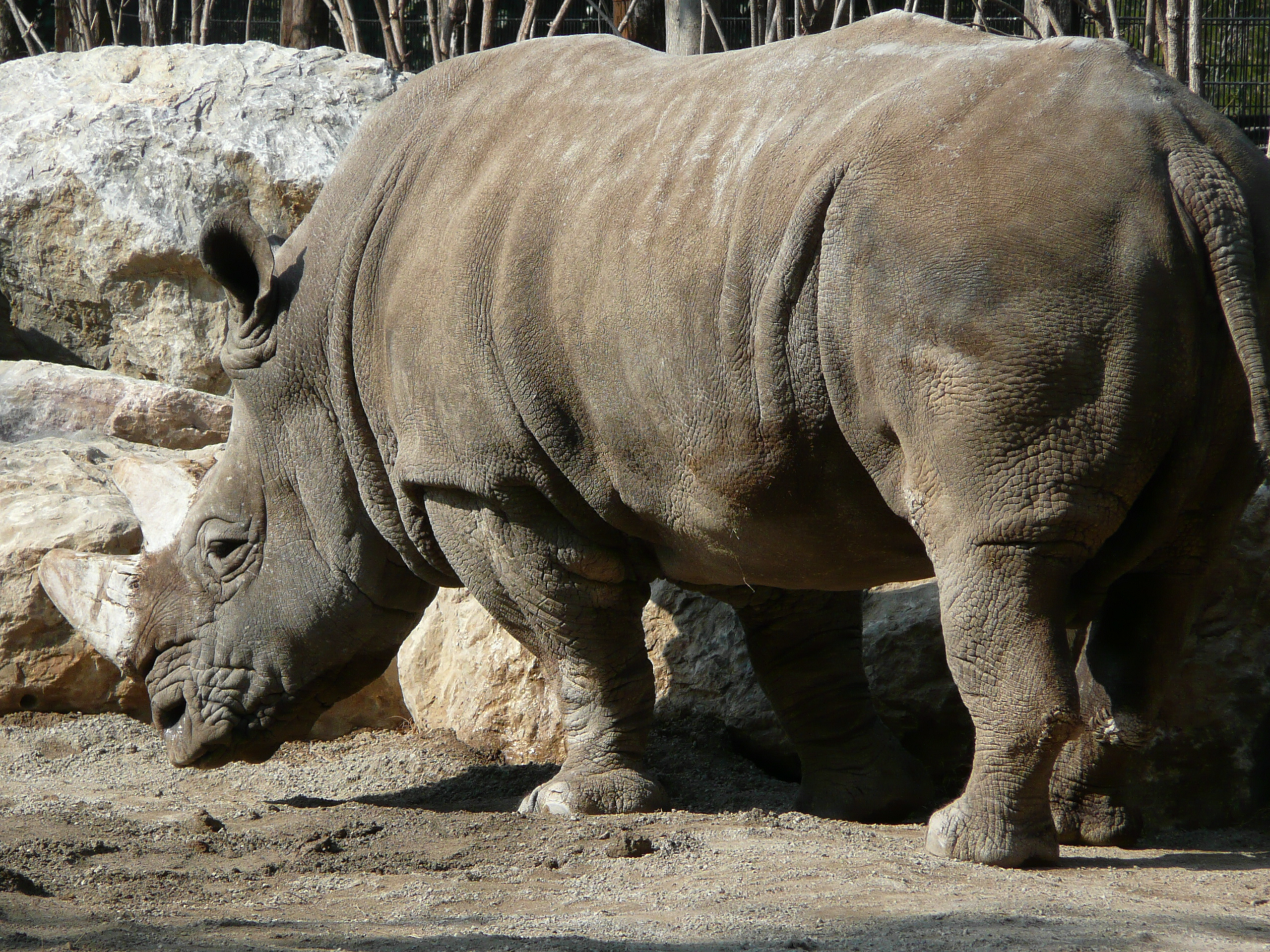
- The white rhino kept at Faunistic Park Le Cornelle, moved to Zoom in 2013
- Interactive map of Zoom Torino
- Type: Zoo, amusement park
- Location: Cumiana, Italy
- Coordinates: 44.93232°N 7.42075°E
- Area: 180.000 m^{2} (1,937.50 sq ft)
- Created: 2009
- Status: Open all year

Zoom Torino is a zoo and amusement park in Cumiana, near Turin, northern Italy, created in 2009. It covers 180,000 square metres (220,000 sq yd).

The zoo is meant to represent the continents of Asia and Africa using immersive exhibits.

In 2022, the zoo instituted a Foundation of the same name to promote biodiversity and research for the welfare of animals.

== Animals ==
=== Fish ===
- Cichlid

=== Reptiles ===
- European pond turtle
- Aldabra giant tortoise
- Green iguana
- Argentine black and white tegu
- Burmese python
- African spurred tortoise
- Rock monitor

=== Birds ===
- Ostrich
- Blue peafowl
- Common moorhen
- Mallard
- Eurasian teal
- Wood duck
- Mandarin duck
- Red-crested pochard
- Rosy-billed pochard
- Greater white-fronted goose
- Swan goose
- Bar-headed goose
- Egyptian goose
- Red-breasted goose
- Barnacle goose
- Common shelduck
- Ruddy shelduck
- Mute swan
- Great cormorant
- Great white pelican
- Dalmatian pelican
- Greater flamingo
- Grey heron
- Grey crowned crane
- African penguin
- Rüppell's vulture
- White-headed vulture
- Hooded vulture
- African fish eagle
- Steppe eagle
- Black-chested buzzard-eagle
- Harris's hawk
- Black kite
- Saker falcon
- Striated caracara
- Spotted eagle-owl
- Snowy owl
- Great grey owl
- Brown wood owl
- Barn owl

=== Mammals ===
- African lion
- Red-necked wallaby
- Black-tailed prairie dog
- Indian crested porcupine
- Domestic rabbit
- Mongoose lemur
- Red-bellied lemur
- Black lemur
- Ring-tailed lemur
- Black-and-white ruffed lemur
- Siamang
- Meerkat
- Siberian tiger
- Shetland pony
- Red river hog
- Somali wild ass
- Grant's zebra
- White rhinoceros
- Hippopotamus
- Domestic pig
- Bactrian camel
- Dromedary camel
- Llama
- Rothschild's giraffe
- Kordofan giraffe
- Reeves's muntjac
- Watusi cattle
- Yak
- Common eland
- Blesbok
- Defassa waterbuck
- Impala
- Mhorr gazelle
- Thomson's gazelle
