= Santi Gervasio e Protasio, None =

Church in None, Italy

Santi Gervasio e Protasio
- Santi Gervasio e Protasio
- 44°56′04.5″N 7°32′35.8″E
- Location: None, Piedmont
- Country: Italy
- Denomination: Roman Catholic

History
- Status: Church
- Dedication: Saints Gervasius and Protasius

Administration
- Province: Turin
- Archdiocese: Turin

Santi Gervasio e Protasio is the Roman Catholic parish church in None, region of Piedmont, Italy.

A church at the site had been established by the feudal lord of the town, the Count of Piossasco, whose castle was adjacent to the church. It was used by the counts as a family burial church. The main altar, decorated by the coat of arms of the family, was built in 1720 by Count Gian Michele. The church underwent numerous refurbishments over the centuries. In 1949, a large reconstruction gave it the present shape and facade.

== See also ==
- San Rocco, None
