= Airasca =

- Comune
- Comune di Airasca
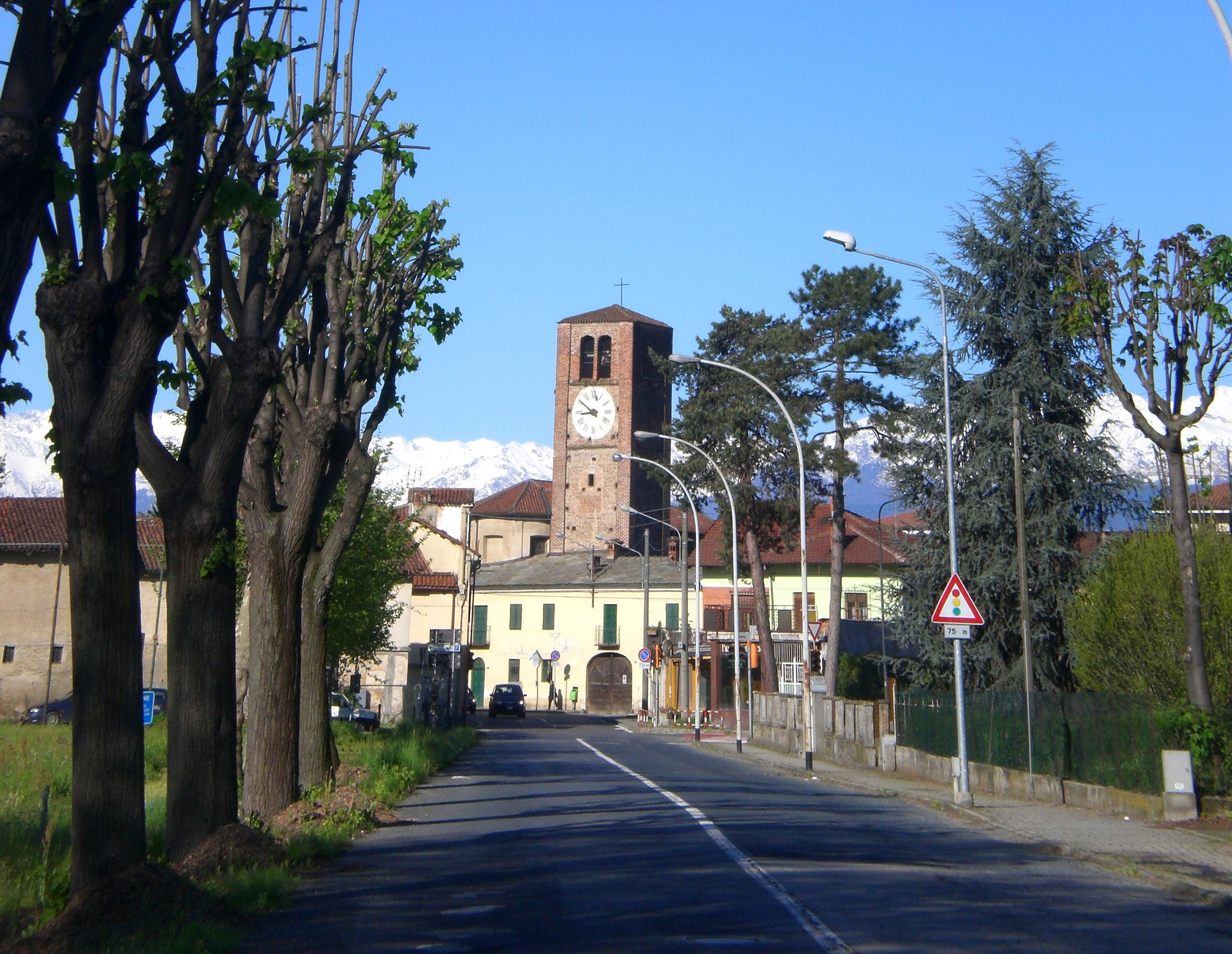

- Coat of arms

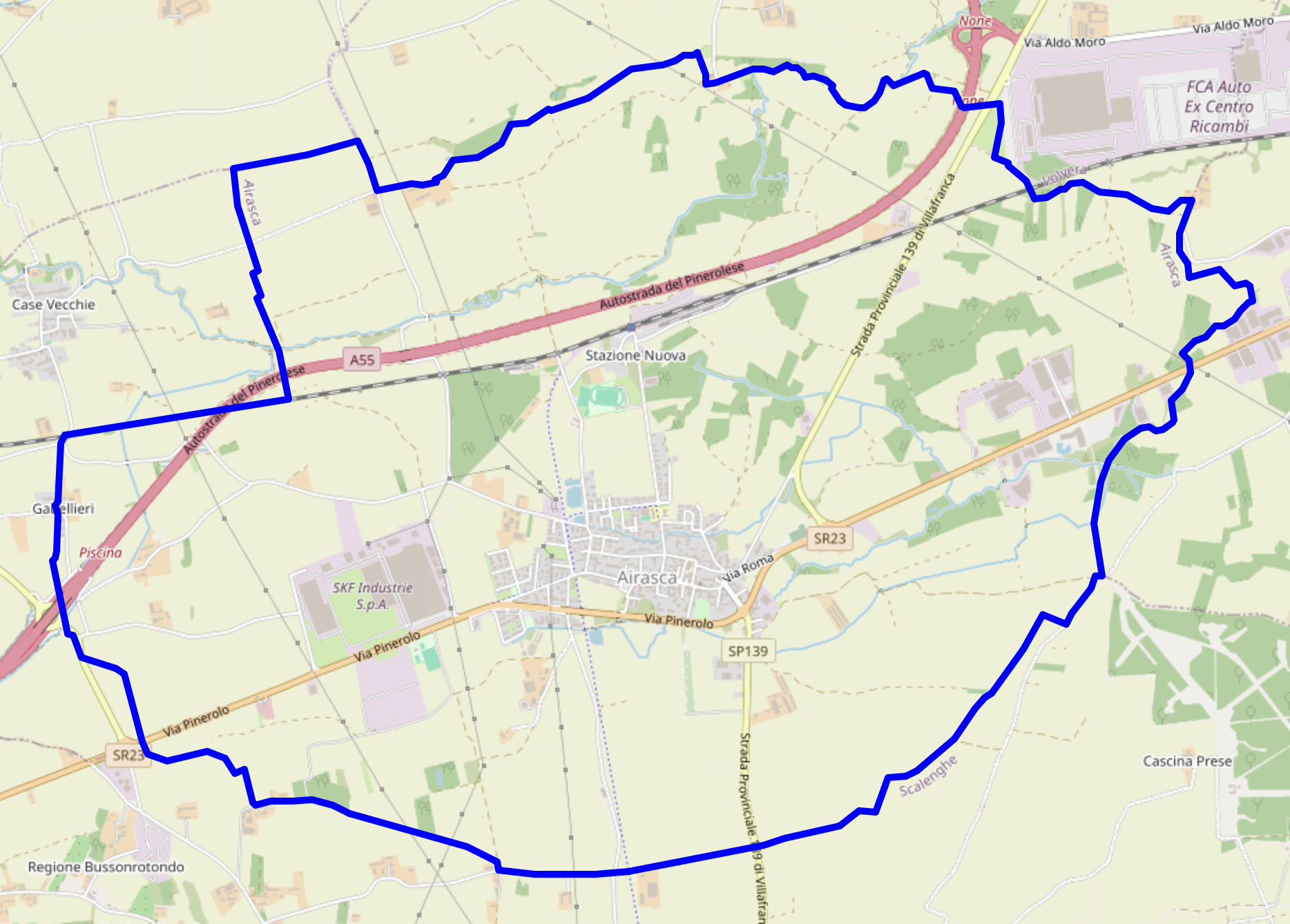

- Location of Airasca in Italy Airasca (Piedmont)
- Coordinates: 44°55′N 7°29′E
- Country: Italy
- Region: Piedmont
- Metropolitan city: Turin (TO)
- Frazioni: Gabellieri, Cascinette, Vicendette

Government
  - Mayor: Leopoldo De Riso

Area
  - Total: 15.7 km^{2} (6.1 sq mi)
- Elevation: 257 m (843 ft)

Population (30 November 2017)
  - Total: 3,732
  - Density: 238/km^{2} (616/sq mi)
- Demonym: Airaschesi
- Time zone: UTC+1 (CET)
  - Summer (DST): UTC+2 (CEST)
- Postal code: 10060
- Dialing code: 011
- Website: Official website

Airasca (Piedmontese: Airasca) is a comune (municipality) in the Metropolitan City of Turin in the Italian region Piedmont, located about 25 kilometres (16 mi) southwest of Turin.

Airasca borders the following municipalities: Cumiana, Volvera, None, Piscina, and Scalenghe.
