= Saint-Jean-de-Moirans =

- Commune
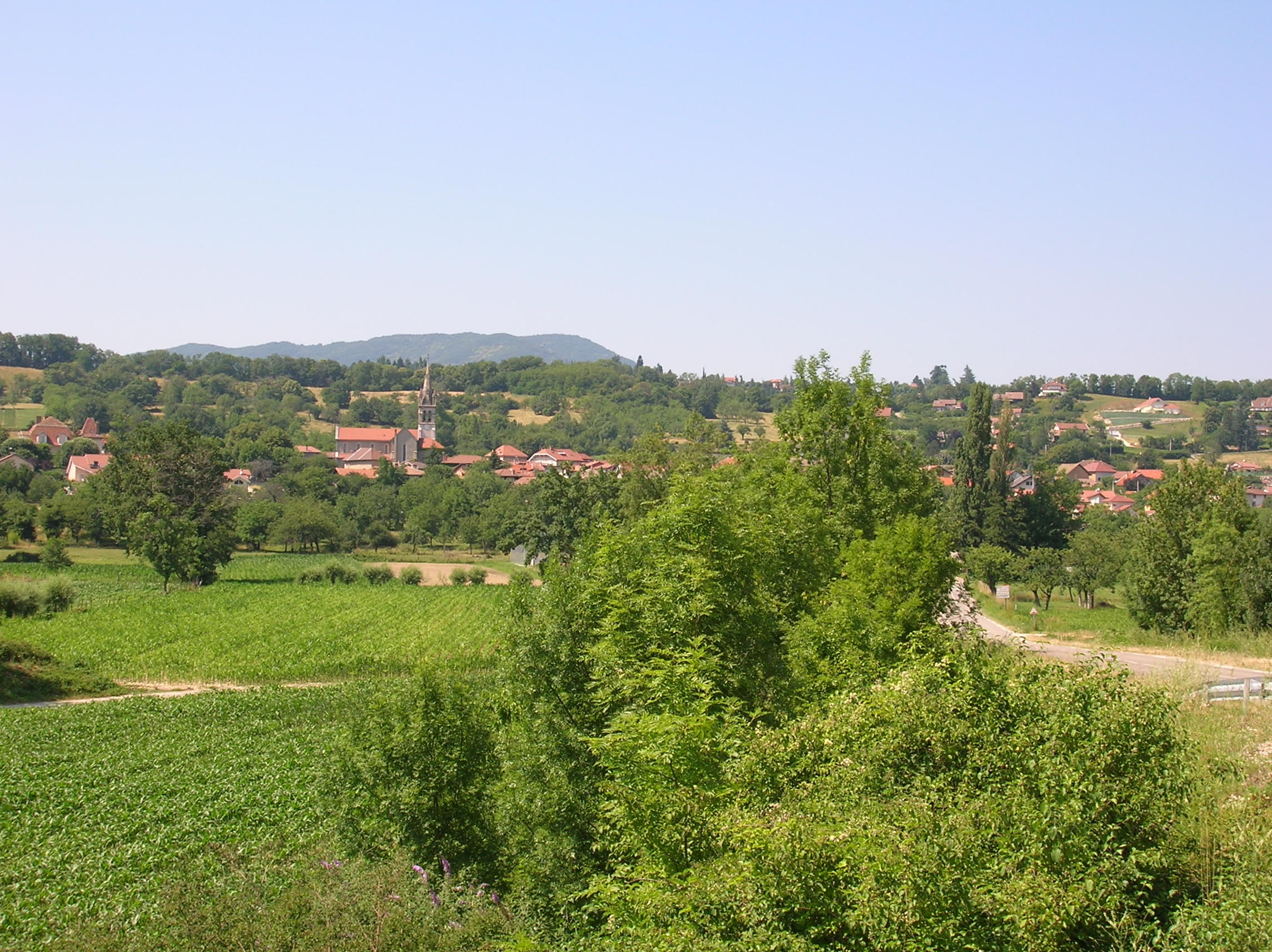
- The village of Saint-Jean-de-Moirans

- Coat of arms
- Location of Saint-Jean-de-Moirans
- Location within France Location within Auvergne-Rhône-Alpes
- Coordinates: 45°20′31″N 5°34′58″E
- Country: France
- Region: Auvergne-Rhône-Alpes
- Department: Isère
- Arrondissement: Grenoble
- Canton: Tullins
- Intercommunality: CA Pays Voironnais

Government
  - Mayor (2020–2026): Laurence Béthune
- Area^{1}: 6.43 km^{2} (2.48 sq mi)
- Elevation: 220 m (720 ft)
- Highest elevation: 304 m (997 ft)
- Lowest elevation: 186 m (610 ft)
- Population (2023): 3,620
  - Density: 563/km^{2} (1,460/sq mi)
- Time zone: UTC+01:00 (CET)
  - Summer (DST): UTC+02:00 (CEST)
- INSEE/Postal code: 38400 /38430
- ^{1} French Land Register data, which excludes lakes, ponds, glaciers > 1 km^{2} (0.386 sq mi or 247 acres) and river estuaries.

Saint-Jean-de-Moirans (French pronunciation: [sɛ̃ ʒɑ̃ də mwaʁɑ̃], literally Saint-Jean of Moirans) is a commune in the Isère department in southeastern France.

== Population ==
Historical population

Year	Pop.	±% p.a.
1793	953	—
1821	1,171	+0.74%
1846	1,218	+0.16%
1872	1,102	−0.38%
1901	1,477	+1.02%
1926	1,448	−0.08%
1946	1,195	−0.96%
1962	1,462	+1.27%
1968	1,579	+1.29%

Year	Pop.	±% p.a.
1975	1,409	−1.61%
1982	1,896	+4.33%
1990	2,399	+2.99%
1999	2,680	+1.24%
2007	2,954	+1.22%
2012	3,215	+1.71%
2017	3,536	+1.92%
2023	3,620	+0.39%

Source: EHESS and INSEE (1968-2023)

== Economy ==
The international Corporate Headquarters of the Rossignol Skis Group is located in Saint-Jean-de-Moirans. It includes a racing workshop where 10,000 pairs of competition skis are being produced, including 3,000 for athletes.

== Twin towns – sister cities ==
Saint-Jean-de-Moirans is twinned with:

- Frossasco, Italy (1998)

== See also ==
- Communes of the Isère department
