= Monte Tre Denti =

Mountain in Italy

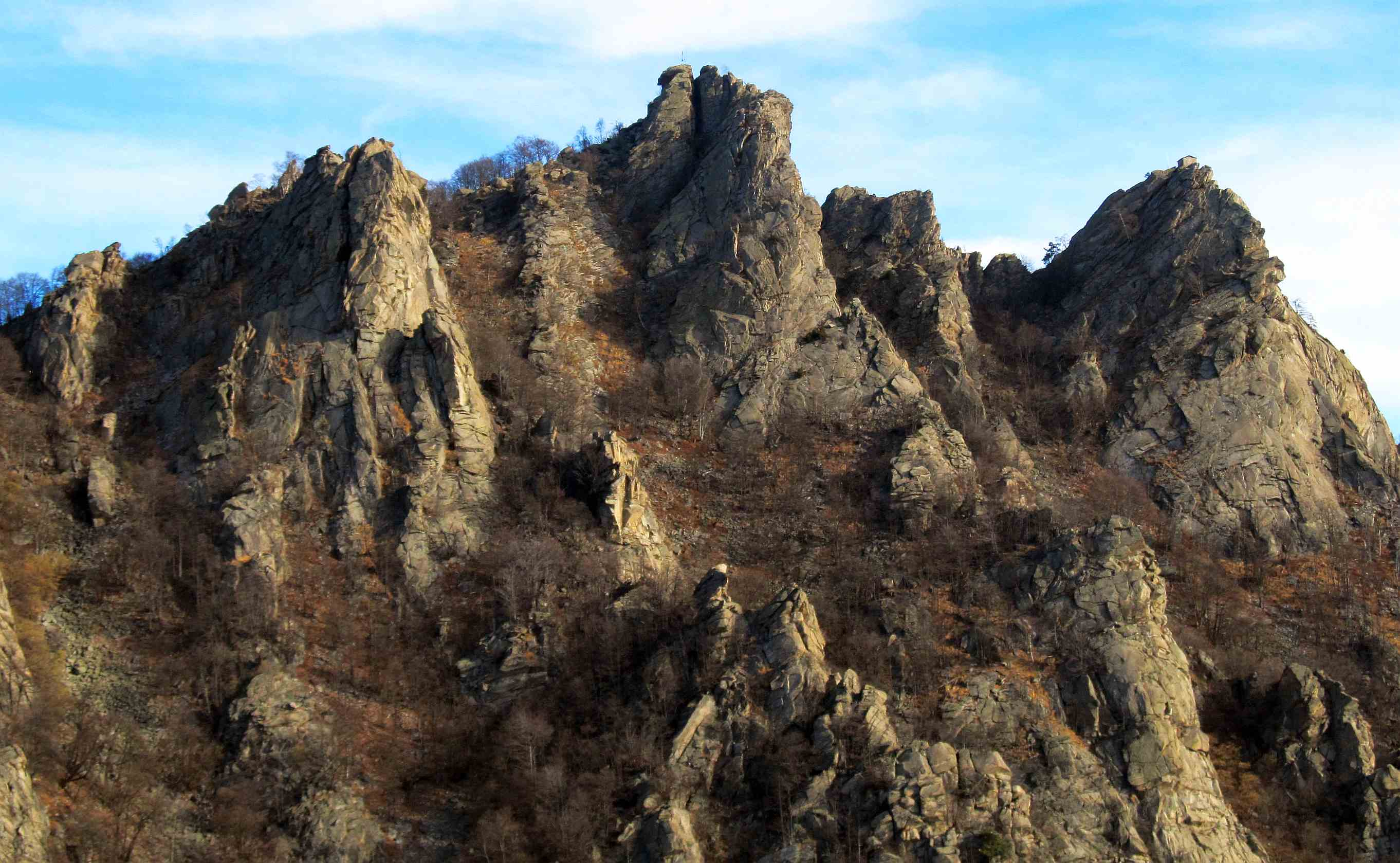

Highest point
- Elevation: 1,365 m (4,478 ft)
- Prominence: 61 m (200 ft)
- Coordinates: 44°58′19.67″N 7°19′23.7″E

Geography
- Location within Italy
- Location: Piedmont, Italy
- Parent range: Cottian Alps

Monte Tre Denti (Italian: Mount Three Teeth) is peak in the Cottian Alps, Metropolitan City of Turin in Piedmont, north-western Italy. It has an elevation of 1,365 metres (4,478 ft) and is located between the comuni of Cumiana and Cantalupa. Together with the nearby Monte Freidour, it is part of a natural park called Parco naturale di interesse provinciale del Monte Tre Denti - Freidour. There is rifugio on a mountain hiking trail between the two mountains.
