= Monte Freidour =

Mountain in Italy

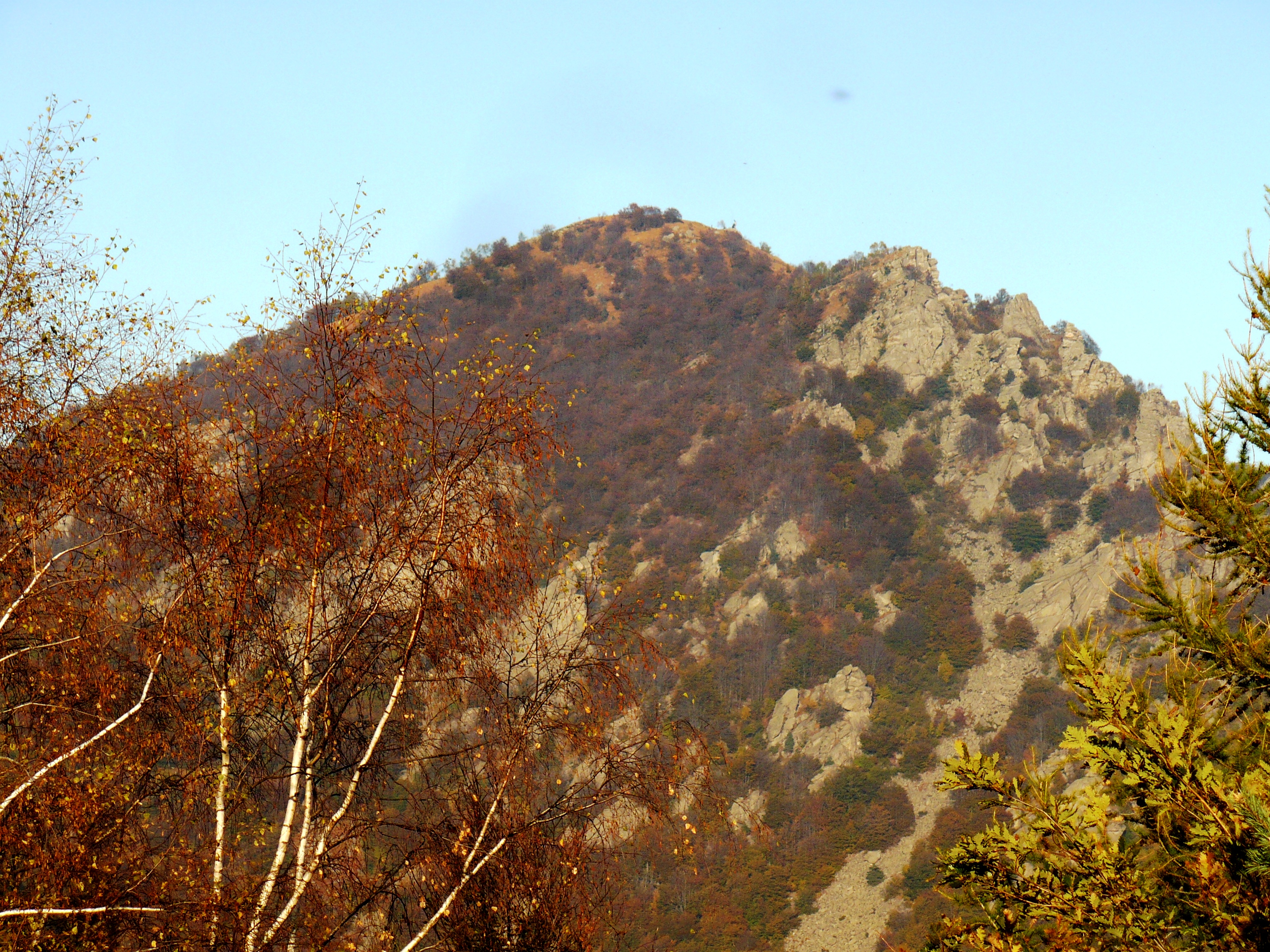
- Southern side.

Highest point
- Elevation: 1,451 m (4,760 ft)
- Prominence: 158 m (518 ft)
- Isolation: 1.86 km (1.16 mi)
- Coordinates: 44°58′22.85″N 7°18′13.49″E

Geography
- Location within Italy
- Location: Piedmont, Italy
- Parent range: Cottian Alps

Monte Freidour is a mountain in the Cottian Alps, Metropolitan City of Turin in Piedmont, north-western Italy. It has an elevation of 1.451 m, with a secondary summit at 1,445 metres (4,741 ft), and is composed of gneiss cliffs overlooking the town of Cumiana.

== History ==
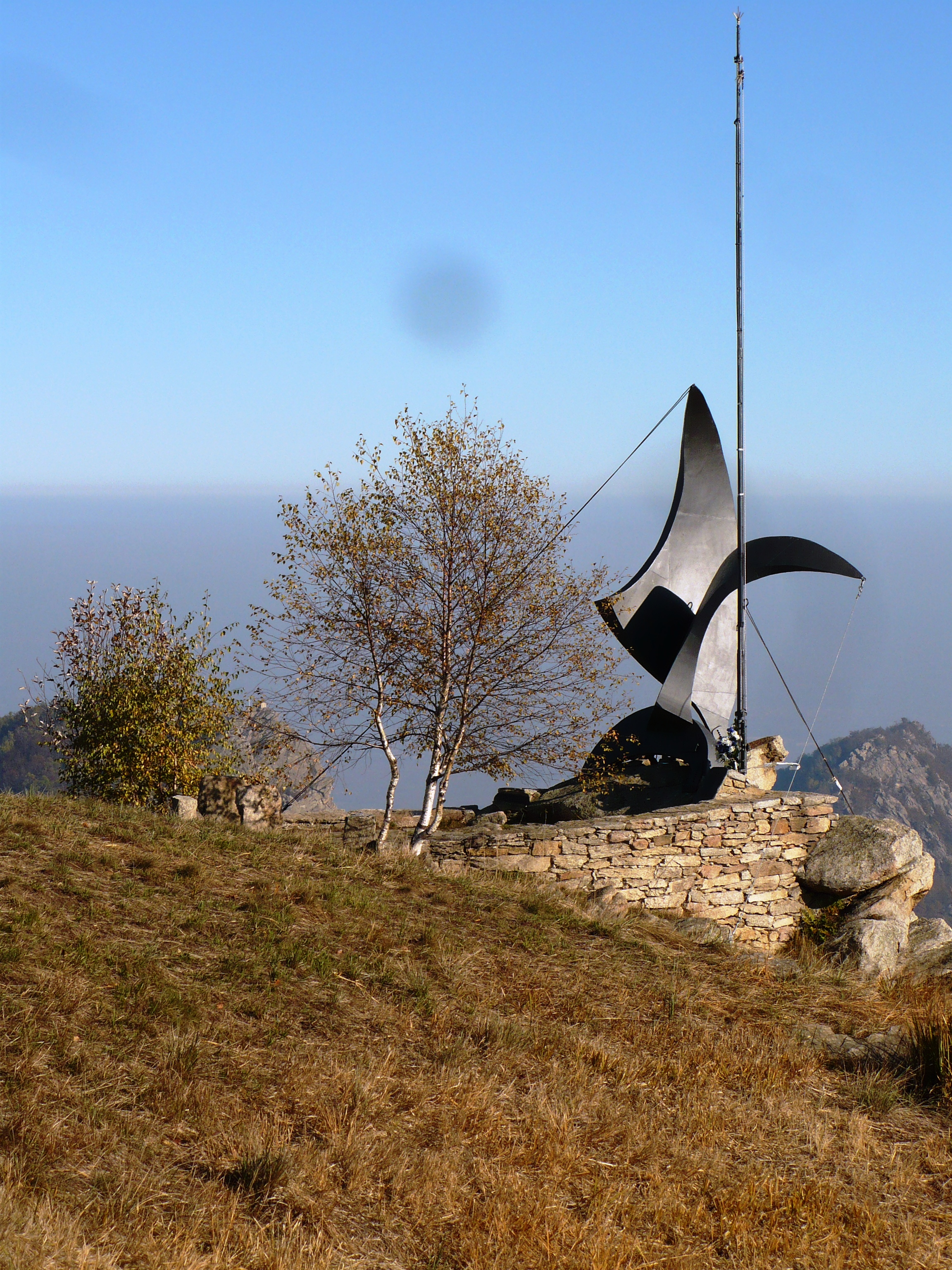
War memorial.

At the top of the mountain is a monument celebrating the 8 members of the crew (F/Sgt. C.W. Lawton (Australian), Sgt.s T.D. Fotheringham, E.H.A. Clift, G. Tennison, D.W. Bishop, D.R. Wellon, S.E. Lockton and J. Bucks) of a British Liberator bomber that crashed there on 14 October 1944, during a mission in support of Italian partisans.

== Access to the summit ==
The peak can also be reached from Talucco, a frazione of Pinerolo, and from Cantalupa or Giaveno. The Monte Tre Denti is located nearby. The summit can also be reached by mountain bike.
