= Volvera =

- Comune
- Comune di Volvera
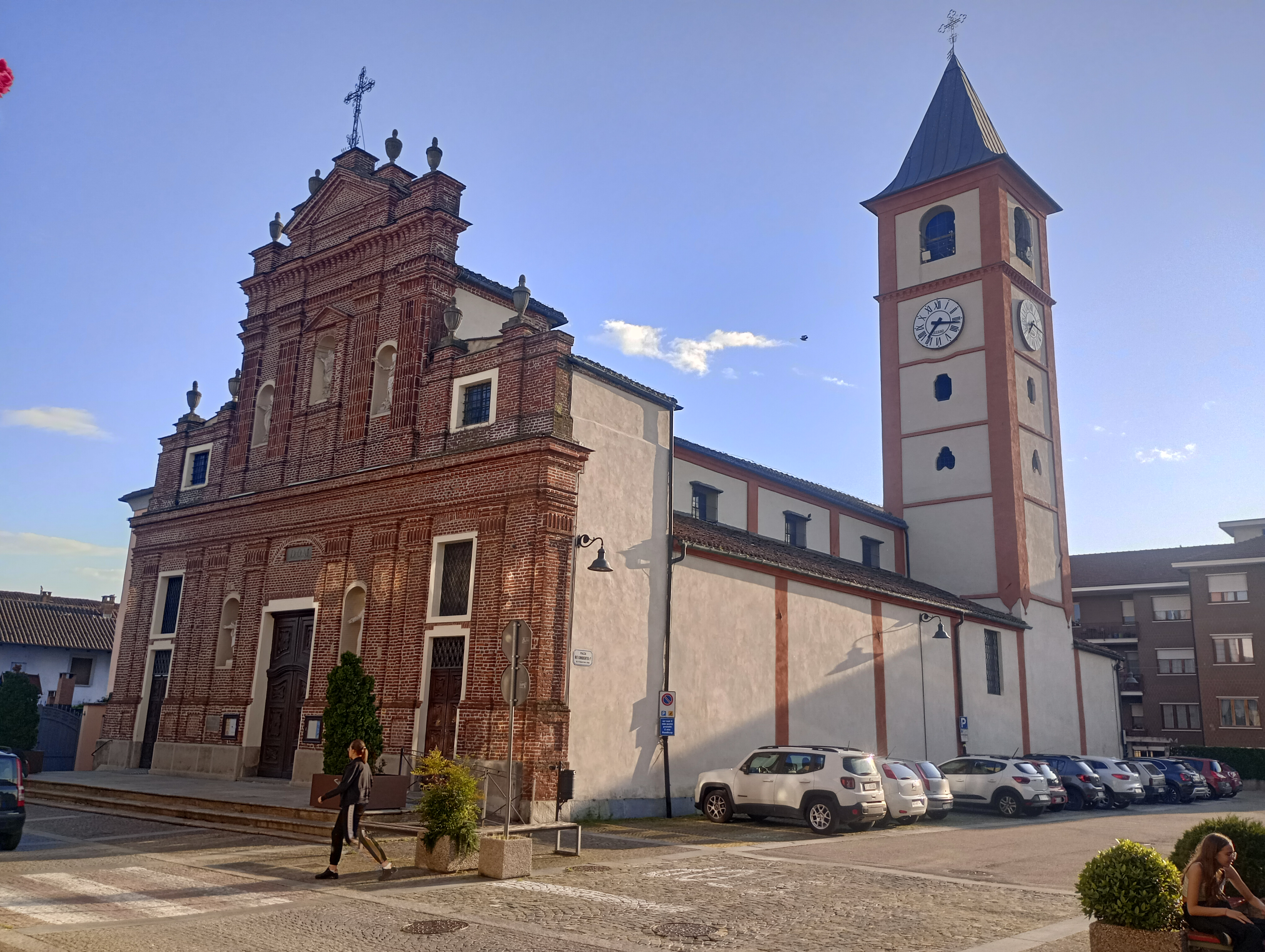
- Church Assunzione di Maria Vergine

- Location within Italy Location within Piedmont
- Coordinates: 44°57′N 7°30′E
- Country: Italy
- Region: Piedmont
- Metropolitan city: Turin (TO)
- Frazioni: Gerbole, Zucche, Panealba, Serafini, Bongiovanni

Government
  - Mayor: Ivan Marusich

Area
  - Total: 20.98 km^{2} (8.10 sq mi)
- Elevation: 251 m (823 ft)

Population (31-05-2020)
  - Total: 8,502
  - Density: 405.2/km^{2} (1,050/sq mi)
- Demonym: Volverese(i)
- Time zone: UTC+1 (CET)
  - Summer (DST): UTC+2 (CEST)
- Postal code: 10040
- Dialing code: 011
- Website: Official website

Volvera is a comune (municipality) in the Metropolitan City of Turin in the Italian region Piedmont, located about 20 kilometres (12 mi) southwest of Turin.
