= Frossasco =

- Comune
- Comune di Frossasco
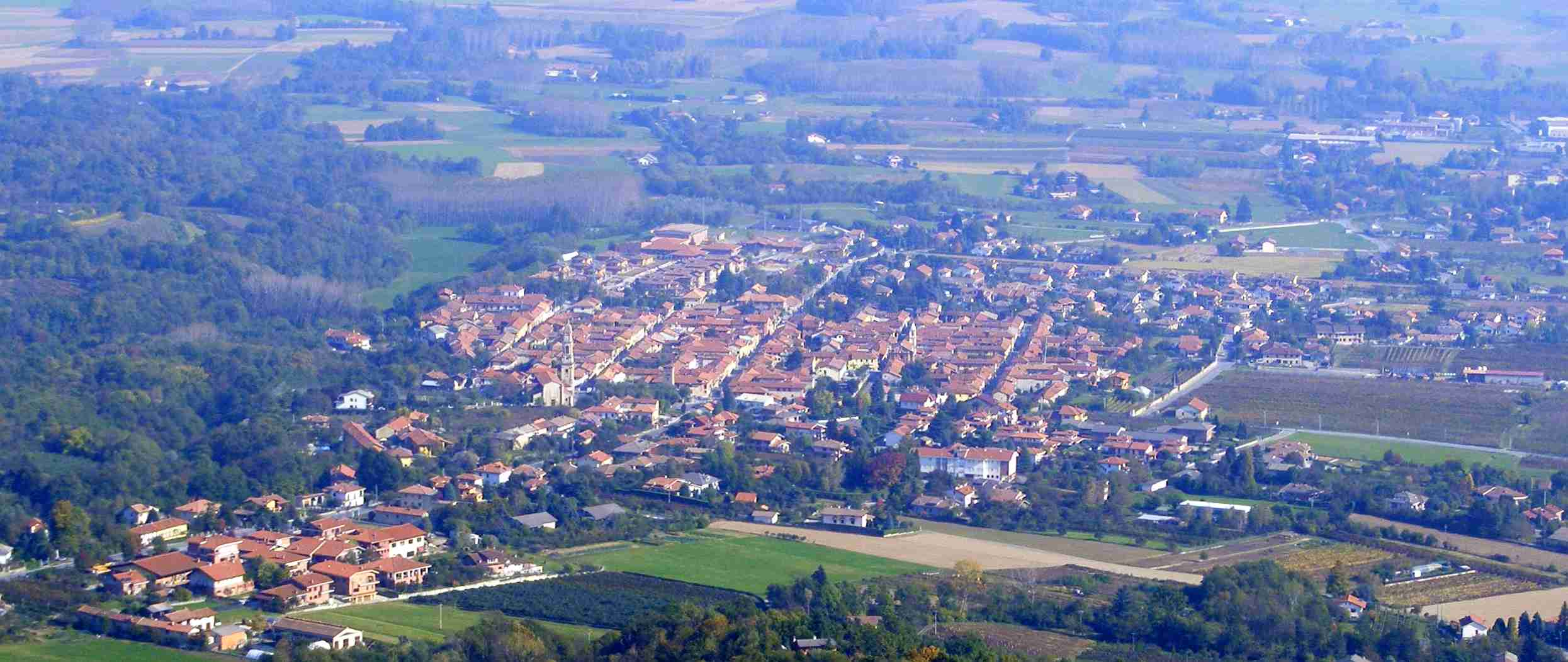

- Location within Italy Location within Piedmont
- Coordinates: 44°56′N 7°21′E
- Country: Italy
- Region: Piedmont
- Metropolitan city: Turin (TO)

Government
  - Mayor: Federico Comba

Area
  - Total: 20.2 km^{2} (7.8 sq mi)
- Elevation: 376 m (1,234 ft)

Population (31 December 2010)
  - Total: 2,870
  - Density: 142/km^{2} (368/sq mi)
- Demonym: Frossaschesi
- Time zone: UTC+1 (CET)
  - Summer (DST): UTC+2 (CEST)
- Postal code: 10060
- Dialing code: 0121
- Website: Official website

Frossasco is a commune (municipality) in the Metropolitan City of Turin in the Italian region Piedmont, located about 30 km (19 mi) south west of Turin.

== History ==
Even if the Celts were the inhabit the area of Frossasco. After the fall of the Western Roman Empire the Lombards settled here, as can be seen by the archaeological excavation that in the Bivio area brought back to light by the old necropolis. The layout of the town centre has an apparently typical Roman layout, but is of medieval origins.

Frossasco later was owned by the abbey of Novalesa, which donated it in 1064 to the Santa Maria Cloister of Pinerolo owned by the Marchioness Adelaide of Susa. The hamlet was given in 1561 to the Count Provana of Leyni and, later on, from 1536 to 1539, was occupied by the French. It went back to the House of Savoy but was again under the French between 1593 and 1595, until it became an Italian municipality.

== Sagra degli Abbà ==
Sagra degli Abbà is festival which celebrates the four contrades of the town. It is held in the beginning of August.

== Twin towns and sister cities ==
Frossasco is twinned with:

- Saint-Jean-de-Moirans, France
- Piamonte, Argentina
