= Pinerolo =

Pinerolo Pinareul (Piedmontese)
- Comune
- Città di Pinerolo
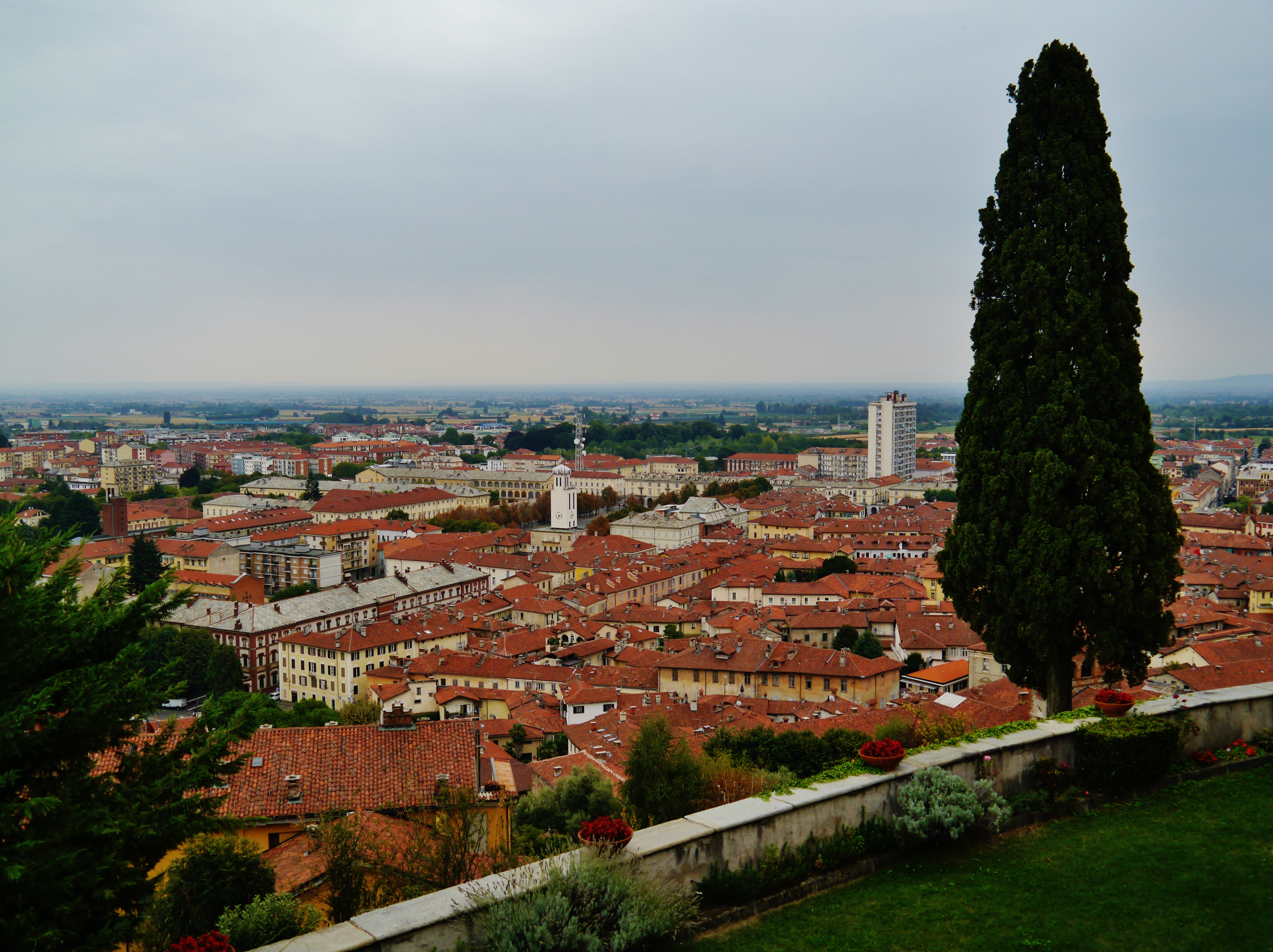

- Coat of arms
- Motto(s): dulcis domino durissimus hosti (Latin for "Sweet to the Master, most harsh to the enemy")
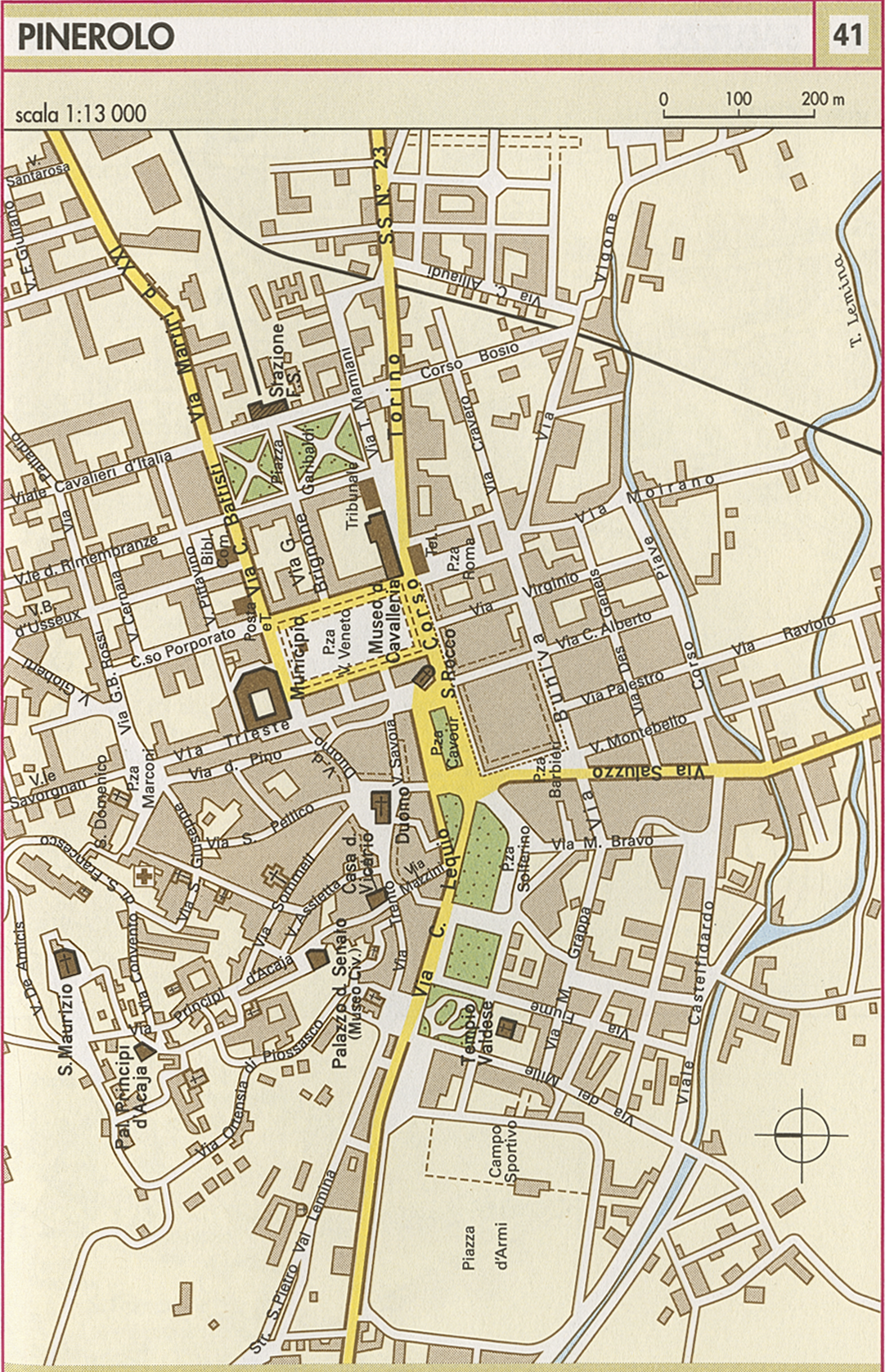
- Map of city center

- Location within Italy Location within Piedmont
- Coordinates: 44°53′N 07°20′E
- Country: Italy
- Region: Piedmont
- Metropolitan city: Turin (TO)
- Frazioni: Abbadia Alpina, Ainana, Avaro/Tron, Bacchiasso, Batur, Baudenasca, Biscornetto, Borgata Colombaio, Borgata Orba, C.E.P., Cascina della Cappella, Cascina Ghiotta, Cascina Gili, Cascina Nuova, Cascina Pol, Case Bianche, Case Nuove, Colletto, Gerbido di Costagrande, Gerbido di Riva, Graniera, Losani, Motta Grossa, Pascaretto, Riauna, Riva, Rubiani, Salera, San Martino, Stazione di Riva, Talucco, Villa Motta Rasini

Government
  - Mayor: Luca Salvai

Area
  - Total: 50 km^{2} (19 sq mi)
- Elevation: 376 m (1,234 ft)

Population (30 September 2015)
  - Total: 35,805
  - Density: 720/km^{2} (1,900/sq mi)
- Demonym: Pinerolesi
- Time zone: UTC+1 (CET)
  - Summer (DST): UTC+2 (CEST)
- Postal code: 10064
- Dialing code: 0121
- Patron saint: St. Donatus
- Saint day: Monday after last Sunday of August
- Website: Official website

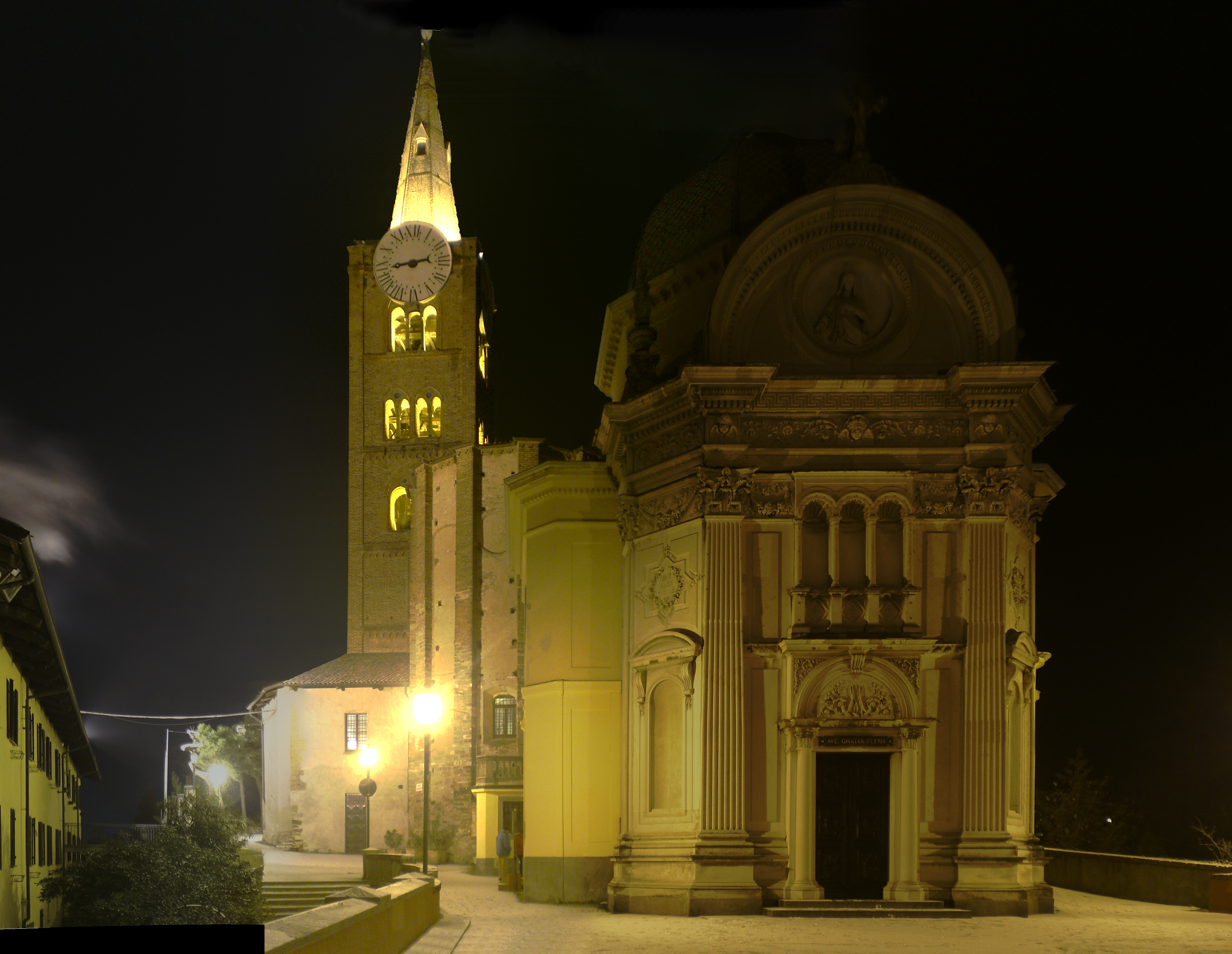
The Sanctuary of Madonna delle Grazie.

Pinerolo (Italian pronunciation: [pineˈrɔːlo]; Piedmontese: Pinareul [pinaˈrøl]; French: Pignerol; Occitan: Pineròl) is a town and comune in the Metropolitan City of Turin, Piedmont, northwestern Italy, 40 kilometres (25 mi) southwest of Turin on the river Chisone. The Lemina torrent has its source at the boundary between Pinerolo and San Pietro Val di Lemina.

== History ==
Archaeological remains found in the centre of Pinerolo in the early 1970s testify to human presence in the area in prehistoric times. Remains of the Roman necropolis of Dama Rossa, found during work on the Pinerolo–Turin highway in 2003, show the area at the time was the seat of agricultural activities.

The toponym of Pinerolo appears only in the Middle Ages, in an imperial diplom dating from 981, by which Otto II confirmed its possession, within the March of Turin, to the bishops of Turin. The town of Pinerolo was one of the main crossroads in Italy, and was therefore one of the principal fortresses of the dukes of Savoy. Its military importance was the origin of the well-known military school that still exists today. The fortress of Fenestrelle is nearby. Later, Pinerolo was ruled by the abbot nullius of Pinerolo, who ran the abbey of Abbadia Alpina, even after the city had established itself as a municipality in 1247 under the government of Thomas II of Savoy.

From 1235, Amadeus IV, Count of Savoy exercised over the town a kind of protectorate, which became absolute in 1243, and was continued thereafter by either the House of Savoy, or its cadet branch, the House of Savoy-Acaia.

When French troops invaded Piedmont in 1536, Pinerolo was conquered; it remained under French control until 1574. It fell again to France in 1631 with the Treaty of Cherasco.

France agreed to hand Pinerolo back to the House of Savoy under the Treaty of Turin in 1696, with the conditions that its stronghold's fortifications be demolished and that Savoy withdraw from the League of Augsburg against Louis XIV.

== Economy ==
The economy of the Waldensian Valleys (right slope of Val Chisone, Valle Germanasca and Val Pellice) and of the plain between these valleys and the Po river course revolves around Pinerolo.

Several industries have their base in this area, particularly the mechanical, paper making, chemical and textile industries, and also absorb manpower from the nearby population centers.

The leading companies are Freudenberg Sealing Technologies (formerly Corcos), which produces seals for rotating shafts and valves sterns, Raspini, a meat processing company, TN Italy (formerly NN, Inc.), which manufactures ball bearings, the Trombini Group (formerly Annovati), which supplies the furniture industry with chipboard, and PMT Italia, which supplies the pulp and paper industry with paper machines. Moreover, Pinerolo is the trade centre of the surrounding mountain area.

The agriculture and the breeding of the livestock are conducted with advanced techniques. Pinerolo is the centre of the community called Comunità Montana Pinerolese Pedemontano, and the reference city for three valleys: Val Chisone, Val Pellice and Val Lemina.

Pinerolo is famous for being the house city of the first society of mutual help, founded in 1848. Today, it is still active and also hosts a museum, the Museo Storico del Mutuo Soccorso with historic archives and a library. Health assistance is guaranteed by the Civil Hospital of Pinerolo Ospedale E. Agnelli and by a network of public and private health assistance centres. The Public assistance is inserted in the bigger frame of the Local Sanitary Company (or Azienda Sanitaria Locale ASL TO3).

== Main sights ==
- Pinerolo Cathedral: 9th-century Roman Catholic church with a Romanesque bell tower and a Gothic façade (restored after the 1808 earthquake)
- San Maurizio: Gothic-style church
- Galup factory, which is famous for the local sweets and cake
- Historical center
- Train station
- Town hall
- Historic Museum of Mutual Help
- Museum of Chivalry
- Santuario della Madonna delle Grazie

== People ==
People born in Pinerolo include:

- Lidia Poët (1855–1949), the first Italian female lawyer and an important figure in female emancipation
- Luigi Facta (1861–1930), politician, journalist and last Prime Minister of Italy before the dictatorship of Benito Mussolini
- Ferruccio Parri (1890–1981), partisan and politician who served as Prime Minister of Italy for several months in 1945
- Cecilia Salvai (1993-), professional footballer for Serie A club Juventus FC and the Italy women's national team.
- Fabio Miretti (2003-), professional football player who currently plays as a midfielder for Serie A club Juventus

People imprisoned in Pinerolo's dungeon include:

- Nicolas Fouquet (1615–1680), marquis de Belle-Île, vicomte de Melun et Vaux, superintendent of Finances in France under Louis XIV, was imprisoned in the dungeon from January 1665 until his death on 23 March 1680.
- The "Man in the Iron Mask" (16??–1703), from 24 August 1669 to September 1681.
- Antonin Nompar de Caumont, 1st Duke of Lauzun (1632–1723), from 16 December 1671 to 22 April 1681.

People who died here include:

- Nicolas Fouquet (1615–1680); see above.
- Anna Canalis di Cumiana (1680–1769) (morganatic spouse of King Victor Amadeus II) died in the convent here.
- David Llewellyn Snellgrove (29 June 1920 - 25 March 2016), a British Tibetologist noted for his pioneering work on Buddhism in Tibet as well as his many travelogues.
- The Venerable Bruno Lanteri, priest and founder of the Oblates of the Virgin Mary, died here in 1830.

== Sports ==
The venue Pinerolo Palaghiaccio hosted curling events at the 2006 Winter Olympics. The Tour de France featured a stage in the area during the 2011 and 2024 editions.

The Uruguayan football team Peñarol takes its name from the Montevideo neighbourhood of Peñarol, which in turn takes its name from this town.

== Twin cities ==
- Gap, France, since 1963
- Traunstein, Germany, since 1986
- San Francisco, Argentina, since 1996
- Derventa, Bosnia and Herzegovina, since 2005

== See also ==
- Diocese of Pinerolo
