= Tarentaise =

Tarentaise may refer to the following:

== Places in France ==
- Moûtiers, historically known as Tarentaise, in Savoy
- Province of Tarentaise
- Tarentaise Valley
- Tarentaise, Loire

== Other uses ==
- Roman Catholic Ancient Diocese of Tarentaise, France
- Tarentaise cattle

== See also ==
- Cardinal of Tarentaise (disambiguation)
- Peter of Tarentaise (disambiguation)
