= André Jourdain (bishop) =

- Bishop of Aosta
- Archdiocese: Archdiocese of Chambéry–Saint-Jean-de-Maurienne
- Diocese: Aoste/Aosta
- See: Cathédrale Notre-Dame-de-l'Assomption, Aoste/Aosta
- In office: 13 June 1832 – 29 May 1859
- Predecessor: Evase-Second-Victor Agodino
- Successor: Vacancy till 1867; Jacques-Joseph Jans as "vicaire capitulaire" thereafter serving as Bishop
- Previous post: vicar-general for diocese of Saint-Jean-de-Maurienne

Orders
- Consecration: 23 September 1832 by Antoine Martinet

Personal details
- Born: 25 May 1780 Saint-André (Maurienne), Savoy
- Died: 29 May 1859 Aosta, Kingdom of Sardinia
- Buried: Gent
- Parents: Étienne Jourdain; Marie-Christine Rasier

André Jourdain (25 May 1780 - 29 May 1859) served as the Bishop of Aosta between 1832 and 1859.

== Life ==
André Jourdain was born at Saint-André, a village along the Maurienne valley in the mountains of Savoy. He grew up, during the revolutionary years, supervised by an uncle described as one of the most respected parish priests in the Maurienne diocese. He himself was ordained into the diaconate on 15 December 1805 and into the priesthood on 23 April 1806. Jourdain rose rapidly within the church hierarchy. While still only a deacon he became a professor of Dogma and Morals at the Main Seminary at Chambéry, and by the early 1830s had risen to become a canon and vicar-general (administrative deputy-bishop) for the diocese of Saint-Jean-de-Maurienne.

On 13 June 1832 the new king announced Jourdain's selection as the new Bishop of Aosta, which since shortly after the restoration had been controlled as suffragant diocese to the Archdiocese of Chambéry–Saint-Jean-de-Maurienne (most of which, however, covered the region to the north of Mont Blanc from which Aosta was not readily accessible). The appointment received papal endorsement on 2 July 1832 and on 23 September 1832 the new Bishop of Aosta was consecrated in the cathedral at Saint-Jean-de-Maurienne by Antoine Martinet, the Archbishop of Chambéry, in the presence as co-consecrators of the two local bishops, Pierre-Joseph Rey and Antoine Rochaix, bishops respectively of Annecy and Tarentaise. André Jourdain took possession of his diocese by proxy that same day, and in person on 7 October 1832.

A synod was held at Aosta on 27, 28 and 29 October 1835, after which were published the Synodical Constitutions and Instructions for the diocese. The period was one of significant development of Catholic instruction in the Aosta Valley, notably, for the girls, with the Congregation of the Sisters of St. Joseph and, for the boys, with the Brothers of the Christian Schools. However, Aosta was not immune from the rising tide of church:state rivalry rolling across western Europe, and in 1857 the religious teachers would be replaced by the municipality with secular instructors, the monks and nuns being expelled in 1860.

The Bishop of Aosta found himself in a particularly intense confrontation with one of the cathedral canons, Félix Orsières, an unapologetic proponent of a version of Liberal Catholicism, and the editor of "Feuille d'annonces d'Aoste", the region's first regular news-journal. In 1851 Orsières went public with his views on what a bishop should and should not be permitted to do. Outside the Aosta Valley, Orsières contended, the bishop should not celebrate Mass without first obtaining written permission to do so. A series of further published opinions from Orsières indicated more wide ranging differences. Jourdain reacted to this gratuitous insubordination with the support from his deputy, the vicar-general Jacques-Joseph Jans, who headed up a commission to investigate Orsières. By the end of 1851, Orsières' writings had been added to the Index of Censorship. The dispute rumbled on till 1855 when, threatened with excommunication, Orsières backed down with a written submission, and was accordingly permitted by Jourdain to remain a member of the priesthood.

The conflict involving the liberal Canon Orsières provided a context for another significant event - locally - in which Jourdain became involved was the so-called "3e insurrection des Socques" (loosely: "Third insurrection of the cloggies"). The "cloggies" in question were poor peasants with powerful Christian beliefs who rose up in the face of new taxes and measures deemed anti-clerical - notably the cancellation of certain religiously based celebrations - implemented by the national government under the direction of "Prime minister" Cavour in Turin. Bands of rioters descended on Aosta during 26, 27 and 28 December 1853. On 29 December Bishop André Jourdain agreed to join with the Syndic of Aosta, Bruno Favre, who was considered a liberal, in order to persuade the rioters to return to their homes. However, 532 people were arrested and 78 locked up, while 26 escaped custody. Four priests locked up in the hilltop prison of Fort Bard faced trial but, like most of those arrested, were then acquitted. The liberal press, represented in Aosta by the "Constitutionnel Valdôtain" newspaper which had been published since 1848, took the opportunity to attack the bishop and clergy for allegedly having stirred up the rioters in the first place, and the lawyer Laurent Martinet, who sat as a member of parliament representing the Aosta Valley, communicated these anti-clerical accusations to the parliament in Turin. Jourdain, who was inclined to political conservatism, addressed a letter to the priests and parishioners in 1854 in which he added the "Constitutionnel Valdôtain" and the writings of Canon Orsières to the banned list.

André Jourdain died at Aosta on 28 May 1859. After he died the tensions arising between the king, his "Prime minister" and the Holy See in the aftermath of the 1859 war made it impossible for a successor bishop to be appointed for another seven years. Until 1867 the diocese was administered by the "vicaire capitulaire" (and future bishop) Jacques-Joseph Jans.
