= François-Marie Bigex =

French archbishop (1751–1827)

His Excellency François-Marie Bigex
- Archevêque de de Chambéry, Maurienne et Tarentaise
- Archdiocese: Chambéry
- See: Cathédrale Saint-François-de-Sales de Chambéry
- In office: 1824–1827
- Predecessor: Irénée-Yves Dessolle
- Successor: Antoine Martinet
- Other post: Bishop of Pinerolo 1817 - 1824

Orders
- Consecration: 24 May 1824 by Cardinal Paolo Giuseppe Solaro

Personal details
- Born: September 24, 1751 La Balme-de-Thuy, Genevois, Savoy
- Died: 19 February 1827 Chambéry, Savoy

François-Marie Bigex (24 September 1751 – 19 February 1827) was a prominent Savoyard churchman who was appointed Bishop of Pinerolo in 1817 and then, in 1824, Archbishop of Chambéry. His life and career were greatly affected by the French wars, which impacted Savoy directly between 1792 and 1815. He spent the most dangerous years of that period exiled in Lausanne, from where he was able to direct and undertake various missionary projects designed to combat the false doctrines that had arrived with the revolutionary armies from the west. His principal weapon in these endeavours was the pen.

== Biography ==
=== Provenance and early years ===
François-Marie Bigex was born at La Balme-de-Thuy, a small town, even then in the Genevois province, set high in the mountains east of Annecy. The family was closely involved with the church. One of his uncles was a priest, as was one of his great-uncles, and the two of them took care of his early schooling. He moved on to attend college at Évian, on the southern shore of the lake. He had been a little older than was considered normal when he started his studies at Évian, but he completed the basic Latin course very rapidly, and he was still only sixteen when he completed the required courses in Humanities and Philosophy. He was then sent to college at Thonon, where he studied dogmatic theology. In parallel, he studied religious texts and Greek with a Barnabite brother, whose lessons one commentator describes as "assiduous". His studies at Évian and Thonon would have provided a conventional preparation for a career as a scholar-churchman. However, in Thonon, he was also spotted by a celebrated local lawyer called Louis Dubouloz, who gave him a solid foundation course in civil law. For a time, he seems to have been tempted by the urgings of Dubouloz that he should become a lawyer. In the end, however, after three years of theology at the college Thonon, he seems to have been firmly convinced that his vocation for the priesthood was not to be resisted.

He now presented himself for the (presumably oral) examination necessary for admission to the seminary at Annecy. His principal examiner was Mgr. Biord. Father Biord was the Bishop of Geneva. In the wake of the Calvinist reformation Geneva had become a centre of fervent Protestantism, and Annecy, safely across the frontier in Savoy, had become the permanent seat for the Bishops of Geneva. Biord and his co-examiners were evidently impressed by Bigex, who was welcomed into the seminary by unanimous vote.

=== Paris ===
As a young seminarian, Bigex continued to impress. By the end of his first year, it had been determined that he deserved to receive his education "in a larger theatre", and he was sent on to the seminary attached to Saint-Sulpice, Paris, in France, where he continued his studies for the priesthood. Starting during the second year of what was designed as a five-year course, he combined his studies with work as a lecturer, which was followed by an appointment to a professorship first in theology and then also in philosophy at the little Saint-Nicolas-du-Chardonnet seminary. He received his license to minister after three of the five years assigned to his course, which came with a useful "pension." He also received, from the Sorbonne University, a doctorate in theology in 1783 or 1785. By this time, he was building up a personal network of influential French churchmen. He was on the receiving end of various tempting job offers, notably from Archbishop de Conzié of Tours and the scholarly Bishop of Arras. There was every indication that he was on the brink of a stellar career, but there was also every indication that his future lay in France rather than in Savoy.

=== Vicar general ===
That Bigex should stay in France had never been part of Mgr. Biord's plan, however. He had plans in his own diocese for his protégé. Summoned back to Annecy, François-Marie Bigex was immediately appointed to membership of the cathedral chapter. He quickly set about re-establishing his contacts, visiting Bishop Conseil at Chambéry for discussions about the future. He also travelled to Turin to pay his respects to the Princess of Piedmont, who seems to have been an enthusiastic admirer, having already arranged a second "pension" for him, possibly at the prompting of Mgr. Biord. She received him warmly. Bishop Biord's death in March 1785 did nothing to derail Bigex's career, and at around about the same time he took up an important diocesan appointment as vicar general. When the formal eulogy for Bishop Biord was proclaimed on 14 June 1785 in the cathedral at Annecy in the presence of the Assembly General of the Clergy, the sad honour of delivering it went to vicar general François-Marie Bigex. In due course, in 1787, Joseph-Marie Paget was consecrated to succeed Mgr. Biord. Paget would be the last bishop to retain the geographically misleading title, Bishop of Geneva. (Note: In 1801 the diocese of Geneva was merged with the Diocese of Chambéry. The merged diocese subsequently lost its territories across the exuclar border, in Switzerland, to the Roman Catholic Diocese of Lausanne, Geneva and Fribourg.) He lost little time in reappointing Bigex to the leading administrative position of diocesan vicar general.

=== Revolution years ===
Although most of the diocese was within the Duchy of Savoy, approximately 20% of it was not. Part of it was inside France, which, during the early 1790s, fell into a state of widespread and increasingly violent turmoil following the 1789 French Revolution. Bishop Paget and his vicar general were accordingly trying to maintain diocesan control over the church in a part of Eastern France, which meant continuing to publish pastoral letters and instructions in contravention of innovations introduced by the revolutionary National Constituent Assembly and the National Legislative Assembly, which replaced it in 1791. However, the real crisis arrived only in September 1792 when the French citizen armies, without having issued any formal declaration of war, arrived to export their revolution under the leadership of Anne-Pierre de Montesquiou-Fézensac, a slightly unexpected military commander under the circumstances, who fell out with the increasingly radical and intolerant revolutionary government in Paris at around the same time that Savoy was formally annexed, in November 1792. Bishop Paget hastened across to Piedmont before winter blocked the mountain passes, to continue his ecclesiastical duties from Turin, while Vicar-general Bigex relocated to Lausanne, which at this stage was still a (reluctant) bailiwick of Bern. From Lausanne Bigex was able to watch over his "flock" of church members back in the occupied former Duchy of Savoy who found themselves in very great danger. He supported them with frequent exhortations and through the zeal of evangelising priests who risked their own lives by secretly distribution the practical tools for practicing the faith, whose difficult and dangerous missions he directed and co-ordinated, providing them with instruction appropriate to the terrible times through which the church and its congregations were passing. Very few weeks passed by when the diocesan clergy did not receive advices and communications of comfort and consolation, helping them in the vital matter of keeping The Faith.

The political and military situation in Lausanne was very far from stable between his arrival in 1792 and the Concordat of 1801. There were times when Bigex was obliged to leave the city. At one point, when the French invaded Switzerland during the first part of 1798, Bigex lived for a time high up on the Great St Bernard, from where he returned to Lausanne and then had to move on again, this time to Geneva. Throughout this period he was nevertheless able to sustain effective communications links sufficient to enable him to provide the necessary spiritual support to the congregations in the diocese.

=== Authorship ===
During his years of exile beyond the far shore of the lake Bigex also found time to produce and arrange publication of several substantive books intended to address the evils that had befallen the church from the French Revolution and the ensuing Revolutionary Wars. These included "Instruction à l'usage des fidèles du diocèse de Genève", "Le Catholique du Jura" and "le Missionnaire catholique, ou Instructions familières sur la religion". The last of these was expressly intended to reduce the influence among the people of revolutionary doctrines which, in his view, "were misleading people everywhere". The book ran to 344 pages and was highly effective in the judgement of at least one commentator. Several editions were produced by various printer-publishers over just a few years. (Note: The first edition of "le Missionnaire catholique, ou Instructions familières sur la religion" was printed in Lausanne in 1796. An Italian translation was first printed in Venice in 1801. The second French language edition had already appeared in 1798. A third French edition was subsequently printed at Clermont.) Copies turned up in virtually every diocese in France.

The French government felt bound to react. The loose knit confederacy was re-invented as the Helvetic Republic following the 1798 invasion. The responsible French government minister applied pressure on the Helvetic Republic to communicate his complaints to the authorities in Bern that they had permitted an emigrant to publish in the Lausanne bailiwick, and from there to introduce into France, a work which they held to be seditious. The author, called upon to defend himself in the face of the French government complaints, defended himself with "as much prudence as dignity", and was thereby able to ensure that the Swiss authorities made an entirely appropriate response to the complaint. Interestingly, while the Paris government launched a minor diplomatic incident over the book with the Swiss authorities, in Paris itself two widely distributed newspapers were extolling its virtues in lavish terms.

It was while he was still based in Lausanne that Bigex conceived and launched his "Étrennes catholiques / Étrennes religieuses pour l'an de grâce ..." project, which involved producing a compilation twice yearly - later, possibly, annually - of simple but cogently argued essays and judiciously adapted extracts, according to the Catholic viewpoint of the author-compiler, whose own objective was simply to "combat the false doctrines of the times and the unholy maxims of unbelief". Eventually, after twelve years, the French police suppressed "Étrennes catholiqueses" in 1810. The author now made a direct appeal to Félix-Julien-Jean Bigot de Préameneu, the "Minister of Cults" and succeeded in having the suppression of "Étrennes ..." referred for arbitration to Bishop Duvoisin of Nantes. General Buonaparte had in 1804 appointed himself Emperor of the French. Bishop Duvoisin, a pragmatic scholar and who was one of the very few Christian leaders who enjoyed the emperor's confidence, undertook the arbitration as requested and found in favour of Bigex's "Étrennes catholiqueses". Despite this, the suppression of the publication persisted because, it was stated, existing editions "contained some articles touching upon the supremacy of the sovereign pontiff". (As it happened the sovereign pontiff was in Savona as a prisoner of the French at this point.)

=== Concordat ===
Pope Pius VI having died at Valence as a prisoner of the French in August 1799, it became necessary to elect a replacement. Pius VII was crowned on 21 March 1800, in the San Giorgio monastery church in Venice, by means of a rather unusual ceremony, which involved a papier-mâché papal tiara. (Rome remained at this stage out of bounds.) The new pope's first priority was a return to Rome, but in order to gain that objective a comprehensive agreement was needed with the new government in Paris. The result was a complex set of reforms embodied in the Concordat of July 1801 which guaranteed religious freedom for Catholics living in France. (France, between 1792 and 1815, included the duchy previously and subsequently known as Savoy). In many ways the 1801 concordat mirrored changes implemented 260 years earlier in England, although the subordinate role assigned to the church in its dealings with the state was less absolute. One rapid outcome was a "more rational" set of diocesan boundaries, conforming more closely to contemporary secular borders. The Diocese of Geneva in respect of which Bigex still served as vicar general, had for centuries straddled the borders of Savoy, France and the Swiss Confederacy. It was now reconfigured, and Bishop Paget, who had been living in Turin since 1792, was retired. A new larger Diocese of Chambéry and Geneva was created, and on 4 May 1802 René des Monstiers de Mérinville was confirmed as its first bishop. In view of the extent of the new diocese, the new bishop determined that he needed two vicars general. The appointment of François-Marie Bigex as one of these was an obvious one. The other was Claude-François de Thiollaz, a former provost at Annecy, whom Bigex had known ever since the two of them had studied in Paris in the 1770s. They had worked closely together for many years before the arrival of the revolution in Savoy in 1792, since when de Thiollaz had led a life no less eventful that of Bigex in devotional service to the church.

In the short term, however, Bigex's immediate priority became helping his bishop with the reconfiguration of the important and since 1801 greatly enlarged metropolitan diocese of Lyon. The task had been entrusted to Bishop de Mérinville, and the administrative micro-organisation involved seems to have been well suited to the talents of the energetic François-Marie Bigex. He completed the work with great success.

=== A change of bishop ===
Bishop de Mérinville retired in 1805 and was succeeded by Irénée-Yves Dessolle, hitherto Bishop of Digne. Bigex continued in his functions as diocesan vicar general. He also retained the rank of arch deacon which had been conferred on him in 1802 with the creation of the newly enlarged cathedral chapter for the new Diocese of Chambéry. Viewed from the perspectives of London of Vienna the Napoleonic Wars continued till 1815, but within the department of Mont-Blanc (as Savoy had been known since 1792) the revolutionary period had ended by 1801, while the Concordat of 1801 put an end to the savage government assault on the church. The international armies stayed away, and the period between 1802 and 1815 was one of relative calm and stability, inside the consulate/empire. Characteristically, Bigex engaged fully with the administration and development of the new diocese. The diocesan seminary was re-established at Annecy, and a number of smaller seminaries were set up. Several major convents were established (or, in some cases, re-established following more than a decade of militant secularism on the part of government). Church retreats and regular conferences of senior prelates became routine under the administration of François-Marie Bigex, long before they became the norm elsewhere in France.

=== Restoration years ===
In June 1815, as the emperor abdicated and the Treaty of Paris was being finalised, Victor Emmanuel returned from his exile in Cagliari to claim his throne in Turin. (Both Piedmont and the Duchy of Savoy were again part of what anglophone sources tend to identify simply as the Kingdom of Sardinia.) Deeply conservative, there was much about the revolutionary changes of the previous quarter century that he sought to undo. For the church administration beyond the high mountains, in Savoy, this held out the prospect of more changes. By a bull dated 17 July 1817 the Diocese of Chambéry became an archdiocese, with four (and after 1825 six) Suffragan dioceses coming under its gubernatorial oversight. Both the existing vicars general of the superseded Diocèse of Chambéry found themselves nominated as future bishops. Bigex was nominated as Bishop of Aire in Gascony, in the far south-west of France. However, when the nomination was submitted to the court it was blocked because of royal determination that the "great merits" of François-Marie Bigex should not be lost to Savoy. On 1 October 1817 Bigex was confirmed in office as Bishop of Pinerolo, an hour's drive to the west of Turin.

=== Bishop of Pinerolo ===
During a seven-year episcopal incumbency, François-Marie Bigex proved himself an activist bishop, implementing a plethora of practical and judicious reforms and addressing admonitions to his priests that were at once deeply thought through and of luminous simplicity, pointing out errors and encouraging obedience to the strictures of the true church. He re-instated the diocesan synod which had been established in 1775 but had subsequently lapsed. He established one major seminary and one small one. Through his pastoral visits he shared his ardent inner zeal for the greater progress of religion. He engaged in several major litigations in defence of the interests of the bishopric, appearing as his own (highly effective) advocate.

Bigex also became known for his charitable exploits. Intriguingly, he obtained a pardon from the king on behalf of a convict from Vaud who had been sentenced to death, but had also recently converted to Catholicism.

=== Archbishop of Chambéry ===
Archbishop Dessolle, who had suffered from poor health for many years, announced his retirement in November 1823. The king selected François-Marie Bigex to succeed him as Archbishop of Chambéry, and although the old king had died by the time the appointment took effect, the new king followed through on the decision. The appointment took Bigex back to the north side of the Mont Blanc massif, and thereby represented a return to the region in which he had grown up. Confirmed in office on 24 May 1824, he seized his new responsibilities with his usual energy. In this respect, sources indicate that his approach contrasted starkly with the more reactive attitude of his predecessor. There now emerged a flood of written advices and admonitions, issued in parallel with a hectic schedule of pastoral visit. After the two decades of revolutionary "modernising" secularism that had formally come to an end in 1815, there was still much to be done to restore the church to its former central role in the communities of the predominantly rural archdiocese. Nor did he neglect basic spiritual support. In this connection, a significant move was the publication of, "Instruction pour le Jubilé", a little book that many of his brother bishops commended to priests and people in their own dioceses. (Note: The book's title, "Instruction pour le Jubilé", references the "Universal Jubilee" ("Jubilé universel") proclaimed by the pope for 1825.) Two actions of enduring impact were the creation of two new Suffragan dioceses, established during 1824/25, one of them to look after the towns and villages of the Tarentaise valley and the other at Saint-Jean-de-Maurienne. He was in addition able, formally on 21 September 1825, to welcome back to Chambéry the Carmelites, who had been expelled in 1792 by the secularist armies of the revolution.

At the start of 1827 Archbishop Bigex was still full of plans and projects for advancing the work of the church in his archdiocese, but with little warning his incumbency was cut short. At the end of a pastoral mission to Bourget, during which the weather was exceptionally cold, he caught a chill. The condition was bad enough to force him to take to his bed, and after a few days it became clear that he was seriously ill. On 15 February 1827 he drafted and issued a final "mandement" (set of written instructions) filled with wise and loving advice, addressed to those under his care. Still preoccupied with his episcopal work, and still fervent in his piety, he received the last rites and died at around 10 in the morning on 17 February 1827, widely mourned. One source refers to the "universal regrets" which followed his death.

== Membership ==
On 7 July 1822 Mgr. Bigex became a member of the Académie de Savoie, which had been founded in Chambéry just two years earlier.
