= Alexis Billiet =

French Catholic prelate, cardinal and politician

His Eminence Alexis Billiet
- Archbishop of Chambéry
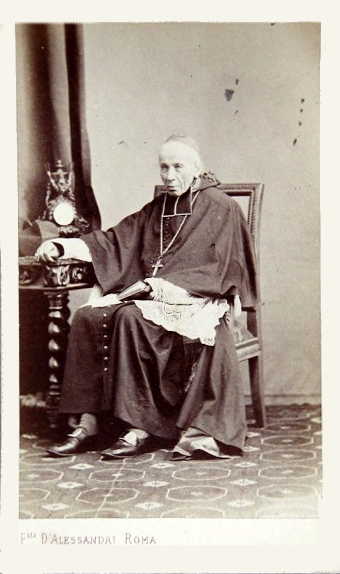
- Billiet in 1869
- Church: Catholic Church
- Archdiocese: Chambéry
- Installed: 27 April 1840
- Term ended: 30 April 1873
- Predecessor: Antoine Martinet
- Successor: Pierre-Anastase Pichenot
- Other post: Bishop of Saint-Jean-de-Maurienne (1825–1840)

Orders
- Ordination: 23 May 1807
- Consecration: 19 March 1826 by François-Marie Bigex
- Created cardinal: 27 September 1861 by Pope Pius IX

Personal details
- Born: 28 February 1783 Les Chapelles, Kingdom of France
- Died: 30 April 1873 (aged 90)
- Coat of arms: Alexis Billiet's coat of arms

Ordination history
History
Priestly ordination
- Date: 23 May 1807
Episcopal consecration
- Principal consecrator: François-Marie Bigex
- Co-consecrators: Claude-François de Thiollaz, Pierre-Joseph Rey
- Date: 19 March 1826
Cardinalate
- Elevated by: Pope Pius IX
- Date: 27 September 1861
Episcopal succession
Bishops consecrated by Alexis Billiet as principal consecrator
- Louis Rendu: 9 April 1843
- Claude-Marie Magnin: 11 June 1861
- François Gros: 1 May 1867

Alexis Billiet (French: [alɛksi bijɛ]; 28 February 1783 – 30 April 1873) was a French Roman Catholic prelate, cardinal and politician. He was the archbishop of the Archdiocese of Chambéry from 1840 to his death in 1873.
