= André Jourdain =

André Jourdain may refer to:

- André Jourdain (bishop)
- André Jourdain (politician)
