= Aymon de Briançon =

Burgundian nobleman and Carthusian monk

Aymon de Briançon (died 21 February 1211) was a Burgundian nobleman and Carthusian monk who served as the archbishop of Tarentaise from around 1175 until his death. From 1186, he was a prince of the Holy Roman Empire. He took part in the Third Crusade in 1189.

== Family ==
Aymon was a native of the Tarentaise Valley. He was the eldest son of Aymeric II, lord of Briançon and viscount of Tarentaise. His younger brother, Aymeric III, succeeded to their father's secular titles. In 1173, Aymon was among the witnesses to the betrothal of Alaïs, daughter of Count Humbert III of Savoy, to John, son of King Henry II of England. Shortly after, he entered the Grande Chartreuse and became a Carthusian monk.

== Becoming a prince-bishop ==
Aymon was elected to succeed Archbishop Peter II of Tarentaise after the latter's death on 14 September 1174. The dates of his election and consecration are uncertain, but were before 20 March 1176, when he received a papal bull from Alexander III confirming his diocese's rights and possessions. He received the staff and ring from the pope in accordance with the concordat of Worms. He attended the Third Lateran Council in March 1179. On 4 January 1184, Pope Lucius III, at Aymon's request, renewed his predecessor's bull of 1174.

In the first decade of his episcopate, Aymon supported the popes against the emperor, but in 1186 he made a rapprochement to the latter. On 6 May 1186, the Emperor Frederick Barbarossa at Pavia issued a golden bull investing Aymon with the county of Tarentaise and specifying the places under his secular jurisdiction. This elevated Aymon into a prince-bishop, an immediate vassal of the emperor and no longer a subject of the count of Savoy. In accordance with the concordat of Worms, he received a sceptre from the emperor.

== Third Crusade ==
Aymon led a Burgundian contingent on the Third Crusade in 1189. He did not set out with the emperor, however, but joined him at Braničevo in early July. In the division of the army into four, Aymon's command came directly under that of the emperor. He was the highest-ranking of five bishops charged with holding the city of Philippopolis after the crusaders occupied it. The author of the History of the Expedition of the Emperor Frederick included a short digression on the resolve of Aymon and Bishop Peter of Toul, both from the west of the empire:

Moreover, I do not think that I should omit mention of the resolve of the Archbishop of Tarantaise, the Bishop of Toul and their companions, for as they, accompanied by a large number of knights from Burgundy and Lotharingia, followed somewhat later after the army of Christ, they were upset by various false rumours that our men had been hard hit by attacks from the Hungarians and that they were suffering from hunger and in dire straits. Then, indeed, almost all the companions of the Archbishop of Tarentaise fled in terror back towards the sea. Nevertheless the archbishop himself carried on undaunted towards the army, as did the Bishop of Toul, and after almost six weeks of rapid and steadfast travelling both saw with their own eyes that what they had been told was false.

Aymon and the bishops held Philippopolis from 5 November until 7 December 1189. His subsequent activities on crusade are unrecorded, but he eventually returned home.

== German civil war ==
On 28 July 1196, Aymon met the Emperor Henry VI at Turin and was confirmed in his secular jurisdiction. On Henry's death in 1198, the succession was disputed. Acting against Count Otto of Poitou, the favoured candidate of Innocent III, Aymon and Archbishop Amadeus of Besançon crowned Duke Philip of Swabia as king of Germany and emperor elect in Mainz Cathedral in September 1198. Philip then re-confirmed the 1186 bull. Aymon remained in Mainz until at least September 1199.

On 3 October 1202, Innocent III summoned Aymon to Rome to explain his conduct. There is no record he was punished. He is sometimes said to have taken part in the Fourth Crusade and incurred Innocent's displeasure at the siege of Zara. There is no evidence of this, however. He expanded his diocese's secular power by acquiring fiefs. In 1206, he received the homage of his relatives for the castle of Briançon. His last public act was to arbitrate, at the request of Margaret of Geneva, a dispute between the priories of Cléry and Gilly and the abbey of Tamié in 1210. He died on 21 February 1211.

== Works cited ==
- Freed, John B. (2016). Frederick Barbarossa: The Prince and the Myth. Yale University Press.
- Garin, Joseph (1942). Histoire féodale des seigneurs de Briançon, Savoie (996–1530). Librairie M. Papet.
- Loud, Graham, ed. (2010). The Crusade of Frederick Barbarossa: The History of the Expedition of the Emperor Frederick and Related Texts. Ashgate.
- Previté-Orton, C. W. (1912). The Early History of the House of Savoy (1000–1233). Cambridge University Press.
- Rhodes, Hilary Marie (2018). The Duchy of Burgundy and the Crusades, 1095–1220 (PDF) (PhD dissertation). University of Leeds.
- Roubert, Jacqueline (1961). "La seigneurie des Archevêques Comtes de Tarentaise du X^{e} au XVI^{e} siècle". Mémoires de l'Académie des sciences, belles-lettres et arts de Savoie. 6th ser. 5: 33–235.
