= Antoine Martinet =

Savoyard churchman

Monseigneur Antoine Martinet
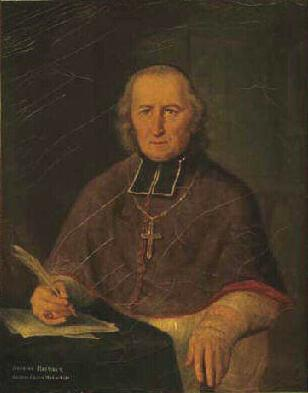
- Diocese: Tarentaise (Bishop); Chambéry (Archbishop)
- In office: 1826-1827 (Tarentaise); 1828-1839 (Chambéry)
- Successor: Antoine Rochaix (Tatentaise); Alexis Billiet (Chambéry)
- Previous post: Diocesan vicar general

Orders
- Consecration: 19 September 1789

Personal details
- Born: 22 April 1776 Beaufortain (Queige), Savoy
- Died: 6 May 1839 (aged 63) Chambéry, Savoy
- Buried: Calvary Chapel (Chambéry)
- Education: Collège royal, Chambéry

Antoine Martinet (22 April 1776 - 6 May 1839) was a Savoyard churchman who served between 1828 and 1839 as Archbishop of Chambéry.

== Biography ==
=== Early years ===
Antoine Martinet was born into an impoverished family in Beaufortain which at that time was administered as part of Queige. He proved a scholarly child: he undertook religious studies locally and was then sent on to the "Collège royal" (as it was known at that time) in Chambéry. After three years of instruction he won the institution's first prize in Rhetoric. The judgment was also made (and repeated) that a dissertation which he produced on Philosophy was of a quality to be expected from a professor rather than from a pupil. Picked out for ecclesiastical advancement by Archbishop Joseph de Montfalcon du Cengle, he was then transferred to the great seminary at Moûtiers where he studied for two years.

Martinet was ordained a priest on 19 September 1789, and then for six months given charge over the little parish of Saint-Paul, a short distance to the north of Chambéry. He then returned to the side of the archbishop, to whom he became, in the words of at least two sources, [personal] secretary, theologian and confidant. He combined these duties with a professorship in Theology and the position of "préfet" at the important college in Moûtiers where he introduced several improvements.

=== Under occupation ===
Overnight on 21/22 September 1792, without any formal declaration of war, the duchy was militarily occupied by French revolutionary troops, under the command of Anne-Pierre, marquis de Montesquiou-Fézensac: it was subsequently annexed by republican France, formally through a decree dated 27 November 1792, while Sardinian troops retreated towards the higher mountains. This was the start of a (not quite unbroken) twenty-three year period of military occupation. In 1793, on behalf of the professors at the college, Antoine Martinet appeared before the new municipal authorities to refuse to deliver the "civil sermon" which was, he said, contrary to conscience. This meant, among other things, that along with a majority of Savoyard churchmen he refused to swear support for the so-called Civil Constitution of the Clergy. A period of confused turmoil ensued during which time five battalions of volunteer militiamen were raised by the towns and villages of Savoy. On 1 March 1793 Antoine Martinet accompanied the archbishop to Turin in Piedmont, the part of the duchy on the south side of The Alps, which was not at this stage occupied by French forces. In August 1793 Moûtiers and almost the whole of the surrounding province were liberated by the Piedmontese army. Archbishop de Montfalcon hurried back to make a start on healing the wounds inflicted on his flock by the revolution. He was, as ever, accompanied by Father Martinet. The local clergy and the congregations were delighted and thrilled by the return of their church leaders. The archbishop was no longer a young man, however. Whether through grief at the human and social impact of recent events, as some sources assert, or through a combination of illness and exhaustion, he died at some point between 20 and 22 September 1793. When Antoine Martinet returned to Turin towards the end of the 1793, before the route over the mountains was blocked by winter snows, he travelled alone.

In Savoy the triumph of the Piedmontese army was short-lived: French revolutionary reinforcements arrived from the west: the Piedmontese troops were forced into rapid retreat. There was little sympathy for revolutionary objectives among the Savoyards, and the impact of the fighting on the civilian populations and their local clergy became savage and brutal. Meanwhile, during the winter of 1793/94 in Piedmont, Father Martinet felt terrible over the situation he had left behind him following the death of his mentor-companion, the archbishop. He now succeeded in obtaining from the church authorities the title of pro-vicar general, along with appropriate powers and duties, which once the route through the mountains reopened in 1794, enabled him to return home to the Tarentaise Valley at the head of a small group of missionary priests, able to take on pastoral and practical tasks traditionally undertaken by the church, that had in large measure been left undone since the French invasion of 1792. These activities were naturally opposed by the occupation forces which were becoming progressively more organised, but Martinet was nevertheless able to build up and then to structure a missionary network of dedicated individuals, headed up by himself. Increasingly he was now sought out by the French. At one point he spent eight days hiding in a (presumably unfired) glass oven in the remote Forest of Doucy. After the Coup of 18 Fructidor (actually early September 1797) the persecution intensified. Martinet stayed for another four months, hiding sometimes in the gaps under the terraces of the vineyards, and sometimes in the attic of the semi-ruined Château de Conflans. During daylight hours he had to remain concealed, but he would emerge after dark in order to visit the sick, administer the sacraments and celebrate the holy mysteries. Every day the danger from the occupying forces became more pressing, and after a few months Martinet was persuaded by friends to abandon his mission in order to eliminate the risks not just to himself, but also to every individual which whom he came into contact. He now retreated back over the mountains to Turin while continuing to provide advice and recommendations to the less high-profile activist churchmen remaining in occupied Savoy. The timelines become a little uncertain, but he was certainly settled back in Turin by 1800.

=== Exile ===
Keen to use his enforced exile usefully, he accepted an appointment to educate, among others, a member of a Turin aristocratic family, the Marquis of Cambriano Turinetti. As time - and the war - wore on he also attended increasingly to his own education, following courses at the university, emerging eventually with a degree in canon law.

It was only towards the end of 1812, as the cream of the French army met with its Moscow nemesis, that Antoine Martinet felt able to return once more across the Alps to Savoy. This time he would stay. He had barely arrived when Bishop de Solle of Chambéry invited him to deliver the Advent sermon in the cathedral. Directly after that Martinet was given responsibility for the curacy of Maché, an inner suburban parish in Chambéry.

=== The ecclesiastical career ladder in post-war Savoy ===
In 1816 he resumed his teaching work at Moûtiers College, becoming a Theology teacher there the next year. Then, in 1819, he was recalled back to Chambéry by Bishop de Solle, joining the Cathedral chapter as a "Chanoine ordinaire". He was installed by the bishop as head of the Chambéry ecclesiastical court and given responsibility for Christian schools in the diocese. Sources differ as to whether it was in 1821 or 1822 that he was appointed diocesan vicar general.

There had been no Archbishop of Tarentaise since the death of Joseph de Montfalcon in 1793, and it might have been concluded, from the alternative administrative boundaries and structures created during and after the annexation by France, that the diocese was defunct. It had, however, been one of the oldest of the Gallic dioceses, and in 1825 the new king announced his decision to reinstate the Diocese of Tarentaise. Up till 1793 the diocese had been ruled by 72 bishops and archbishops. Two had later become popes. On 19 March 1826 Antoine Martinet was installed as the seventy-third Bishop of Tarentaise. (Note: Note that Tarentaise is the old name for the town of Moûtiers. The names can be used interchangeably, but church related sources tend to refer to the little town as Tarentaise. Tarentaise is also the name used for the valley in which the town is situated, but NOT for the river that flows through it.) Once installed he lost no time in arranging for the rebuilding of the cathedral, reversing the vandalism inflicted by the French Revolution. The reconstruction lasted for four years: sources note that the surrounding municipalities and the clergy were generous with their contributions.

=== Archbishop ===
By the time the repairs on the cathedral at Moûtiers had been completed, Father Martinet had moved on again. The death of Archbishop Bigex in February 1827 had created a vacancy at the head of the diocese of Chambéry which by this time (since 1817) had become an archdiocese, covering a wider area that encompassed Annecy, Tarentaise (Moûtiers) and Saint-Jean-de-Maurienne, along with Chambéry itself. Martinet was selected for the post 20 December 1827 and installed in succession to Bigex on the Feast of Quasimodo in 1828. (Note: The Feast of Quasimodo was celebrated on the first Sunday after Easter until replaced with "Divine Mercy Sunday" by Pope John Paul II in the year 2000.)

By this time cyclical factors were softening the impact of post-war austerity, and Antoine Martinet's eleven year incumbency as archbishop is remembered for being exceptionally active. The archdiocese was a rural one, containing at that time just 168 parishes. Yet during those eleven years Martinet oversaw the construction of 40 new churches, while a further 19 benefitted from significant repair programmes. 22 presbyteries were rebuilt and all the others, to a lesser or greater extent, repaired. Nor was Martinet's period in office restricted to an ecclesiastical construction boom. He undertook numerous works of piety and charity, set up various missionary projects and engaged energetically on the pastoral front. There were also new parishes established along with a large number of church schools.

During his last few years Antoine Martinet was affected by chronic illness, though he refused to let this interfere with his work. Then at the start of 1839 a marked deterioration in his condition set in with a period of cruel insomnia. He suffered greatly during his final three months. Then, during the night of 10/11 April 1839, he suffered much torment at the end of which he had come to terms with the imminence of his "final journey". In the morning his spirit was much calmer and he appeared to be much better in himself. He died at Chambéry a few days later, at around half past seven on the morning of 6 May 1839, fully reconciled to his situation.

He had chosen for his burial location the little Calvary Chapel on the western slope of the Lémenc Hill to the north of the town. Martinet had himself overseen the chapel's reconstruction, to replace the previous building which had been destroyed when French troops had arrived back in 1792. Martinet's burial took place on 8 May 1839 in the presence of the municipal councillors and officers, of the clergy, and of a large crowd that stretched out along the route to the chapel. A more elaborate memorial service was held at the cathedral on 12 June 1839. A heartfelt and lengthy tribute was delivered by the Abbé Rendu.
