= Bellevaux Abbey =

Cistercian monastery near Cirey, France

Coordinates: 47°24′16″N 6°07′13″E

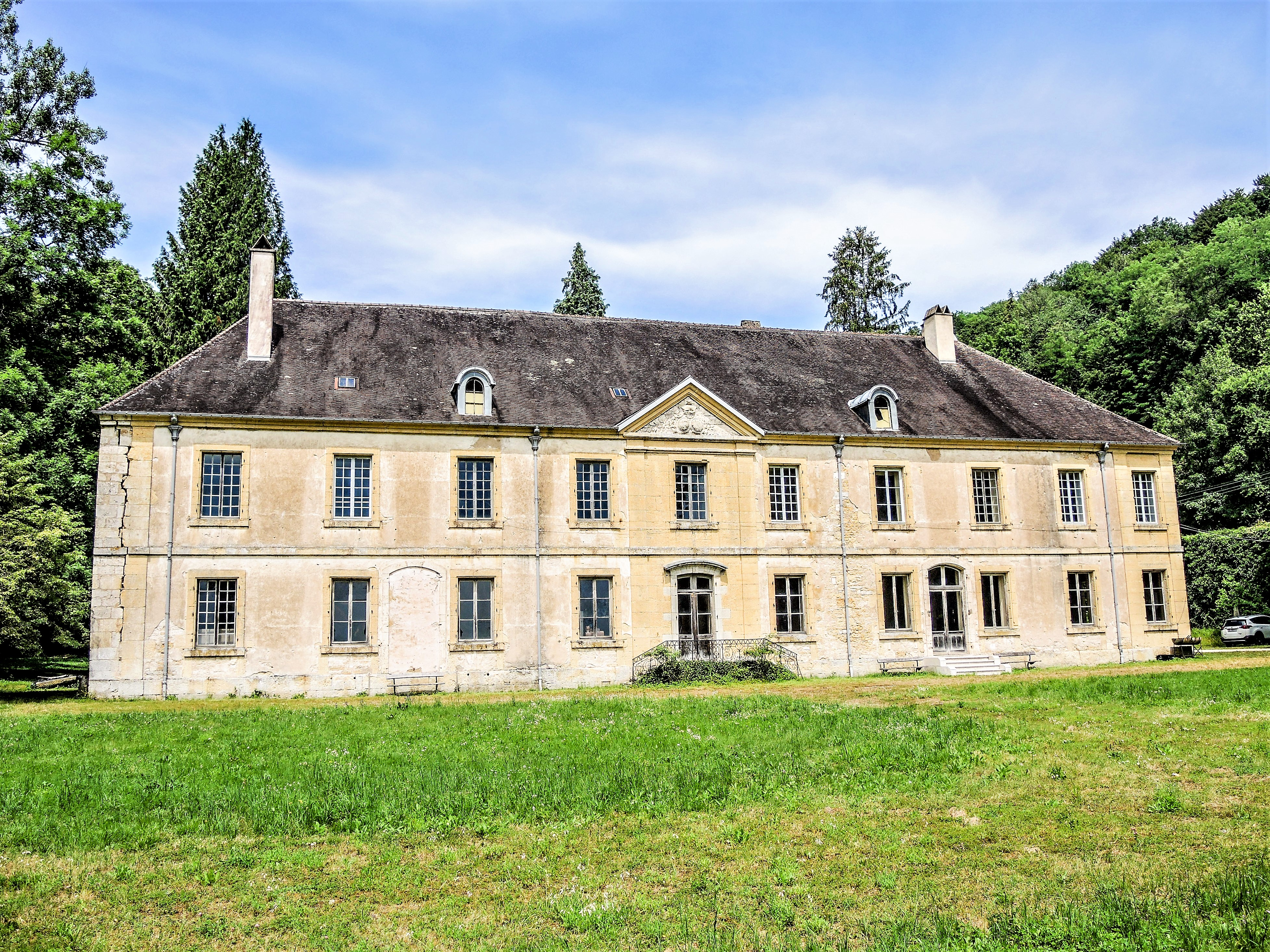
The former Bellevaux Abbey

Bellevaux Abbey was a Cistercian monastery, founded in 1120 by Pons de Morimond, near the present-day Cirey, Haute-Saône, France. At that time it was in Franche-Comté. It was suppressed in 1790 and sold in 1791. Shortly afterwards the church was demolished. 1795 the buildings were bought by Jean-Charles Pichegru.

It was a daughter house of Morimond Abbey. The author Burchard of Bellevaux was abbot from 1158 until about 1165. Peter of Tarentaise died there, as he arrived at the abbey in 1174, giving it his relics. These were for a long time disputed by Tamié Abbey.

It had strong connections to the local nobles. Otto de la Roche gave Bellevaux the sacked Daphni Monastery in Greece shortly after 1205.

Bellevaux Abbey was sacked in 1474 by French troops, and burned in 1636 by troops from Weimar. All the existing buildings were erected by the last abbot Louis Albert de Lezay-Marnésia, bishop of Évreux between 1762 and 1788.

Eugene Huvelin (d. 1828) bought it in 1817, and installed a Trappist religious community there, which however left again at the outbreak of the 1830 Revolution. The premises were sold to private owners in 1837.
