= Burchard of Bellevaux =

Medieval abbot and author

Burchard of Bellevaux (c. 1100–1165) was a Cistercian monk and author who was known for his work Apologia de barbis (A Defense of Beards). A student of the Cistercian reformer Bernard of Clairvaux, in 1136, he became abbot of the monastery of Balerne, a Benedictine monastery that adopted the Cistercian reforms. After 22 years there, he became the abbot of Bellevaux, where he composed the Apologia de barbis sometime before his death around 1165.

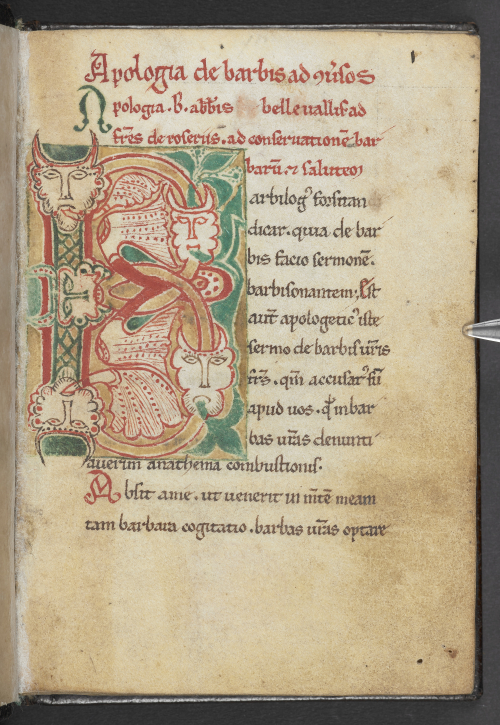
Opening page of Apologia de barbis (British Library Add MS 41997, f. 1r)

== Apologia de barbis ==
The Aplogia de barbis was unknown until 1929, when the manuscript was discovered in a Swiss booksellers by E. Goldschmidt, who later produced the first edition of the book in a limited run of 300 copies.

A significant example of 12th-century biblical exegesis, the text is divided into three sermons: "On the Cleanliness of Beards," "On the Form of Beards," and "On the Nature of Beards." Each sermon offers allegorical interpretations of beards in the bible and other medieval Christian texts as well as moralizing commentary on contemporary styles of beards and mustaches. (For example, his discussion of beards on goats leads to a conclusion that Jews are correctly caricatured as goats, since "their long, dangling beards prevent the 'truth' from entering their hearts", according to Sebastian Coxon.) Written in response to lay-brothers who believed they were being forced to shave their beards, the Apologia de barbis pays particular attention to explaining why lay-brothers should remain bearded while monks were required to shave. In addition, there is a lengthy explanation of the monastic tonsure.

== Editions ==
- Huygens, R.B.C. Apologiae Duae. Corpus Christianorum: Continuatio Mediaevalis 62. Turnhout: Brepols, 1985.
- Goldschmidt, E. Burchardus de Bellevaux: Apologia de barbis. Cambridge: Cambridge University Press, 1935.

== Translations ==
- McAlhany, J. Beards & Baldness in the Middle Ages: Three Texts. Brooklyn, NY: Leverhill, 2024 (contains a translation of the Apologia de barbis, with notes, and a brief introduction). ISBN 979-8989699308.
