= Thibault Verny =

French Catholic archbishop

The Most Reverend Thibault Verny
- Archbishop of Chambéry
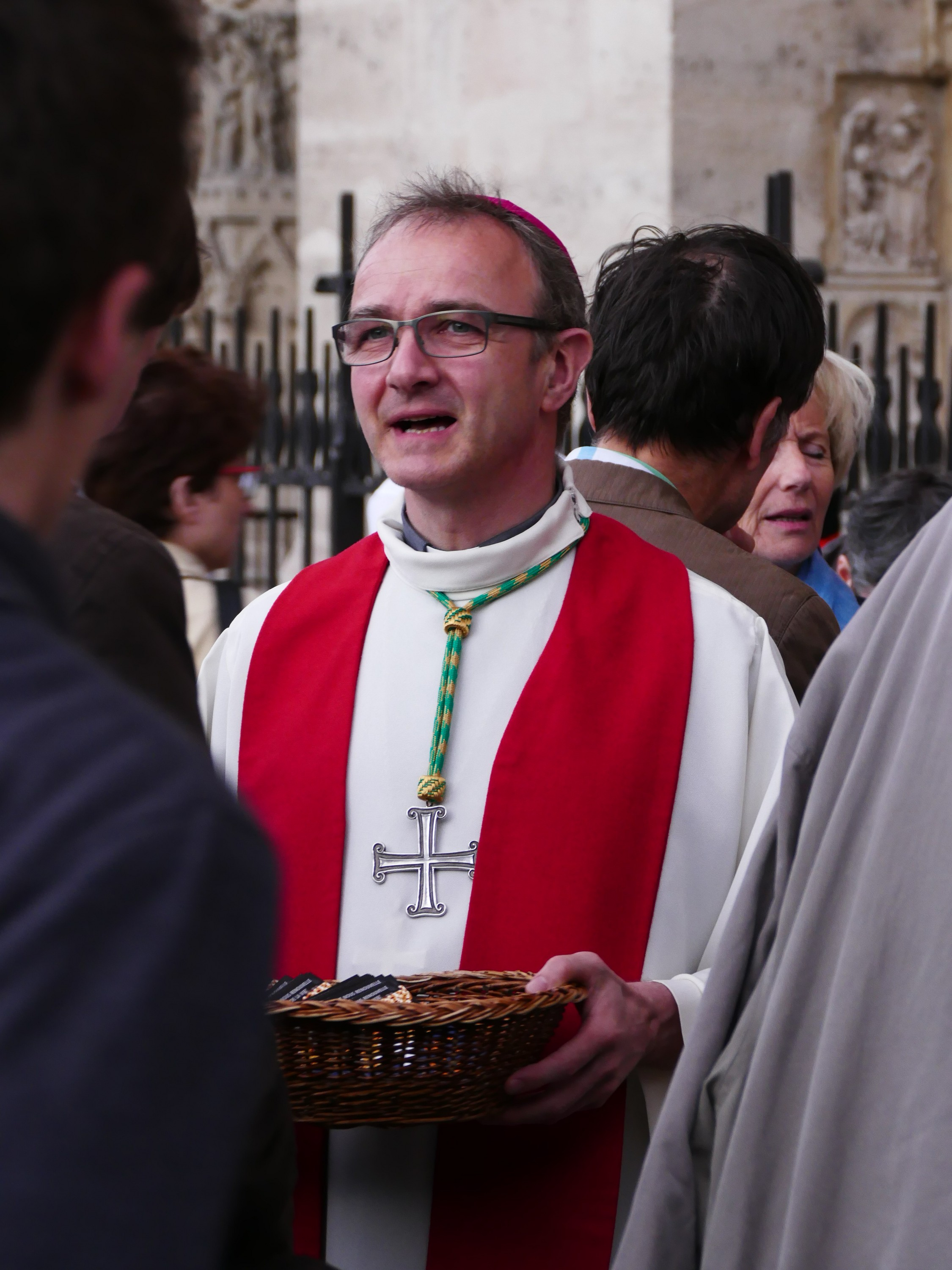
- Verny in 2017
- Archdiocese: Chambéry
- Appointed: 11 May 2023
- Predecessor: Philippe Ballot
- Other post: President of the Pontifical Commission for the Protection of Minors (2025–)
- Previous posts: Auxiliary bishop of Paris (2016–2023); Chair of the Council for Preventing and Combating Child Abuse of the Episcopal Conference of France (2022–2025)

Orders
- Ordination: 27 June 1998 by Jean-Marie Lustiger
- Consecration: 9 September 2016 by André Vingt-Trois

Personal details
- Born: 7 November 1965 (age 60) Paris
- Education: Pontifical French Seminary; Pontifical Gregorian University
- Motto: Si tu savais le don de Dieu; If you knew the gift of God; John 4:10
- Coat of arms

Thibault Verny (born 7 November 1965) is a French prelate of the Catholic Church who has been president of the Pontifical Commission for the Protection of Minors since July 2025. He has been Archbishop of Chambéry (Note: He is also Bishop of Maurienne and Bishop of Tarentaise. His three episcopal sees were united as equals without merging in 1966 by Pope Paul VI. The archdiocese and the two dioceses remain distinct sees and no one of them is subject to either of the others.) since 2023. Since being named a bishop in 2016 he has played a key role in protecting minors against sexual abuse, first in Paris and then on the national level in France.

== Biography ==
Thibault Verny was born in Paris on 7 November 1965. He earned a diploma in engineering at the École Supérieure de Physique et de Chimie Industrielles de la ville de Paris in 1990. He entered the archdiocesan seminary of Paris and then attended the Pontifical French Seminary in Rome. He earned a licentiate in dogmatic theology from the Pontifical Gregorian University. He was ordained a priest of the Archdiocese of Paris on 27 June 1998.

He served as chaplain of the Lycée Janson-de-Sailly and its Collège Eugène-Delacroix in Paris from 1999 to 2005, then parish priest of Notre-Dame de Lorette from 2005 to 2016 and dean of the Magenta-Lafayette deanery from 2007 to 2016. He was appointed assistant to the diocesan service for vocations in 2014. He was named vicar general of Paris on 8 May 2016, effective 1 September. In 2008 he also became an oblate of the Benedictine Monastery of Notre Dame de la Sainte Espérance in Mesnil-Saint-Loup.

On 25 June 2016, Pope Francis named him an auxiliary bishop of Paris and titular bishop of Lamzella. He received his episcopal consecration on 9 September He chose as his episcopal motto Si tu savais le don de Dieu ("If you knew the gift of God") from John's gospel. As auxiliary he was charged with managing the archdiocese's efforts to protect minors from sexual abuse and care for victims of sexual abuse. He participated in the negotiations between the Archdiocese of Paris and the Paris Public Prosecutor's Office to develop procedures for reporting allegations of abuse to civil authorities and managed the implementation and monitoring of the program.

Within the French Bishops Conference (CEF), he served from 2017 to 2022 on the Council for Christian Unity and Jewish relations, with particular responsibility for the Jewish community. On 1 July 2022, Verny became chair of the CEF's Council for Preventing and Combating Child Abuse. In that role he initiating various training and prevention programs. His service in that position ended in June 2025. (Note: Gérard Le Stang, Bishop of Amiens, succeeded him as chair. Éric de Moulins-Beaufort, Archbishop of Reims, outgoing head of the French Bishops Conference, said on 4 April 2025 that Verny had asked to be relieved of his duties as chair of the Council in order to concentrate on the affairs of his archdiocese and his work as a member of the Pontifical Commission.) On 30 September 2022, he was named a member of the Pontifical Commission for the Protection of Minors. As a member he played a role in the Commission's work in the Central African Republic and the Ivory Coast.

On 11 May 2023, Pope Francis named him archbishop of Chambéry and bishop of Saint-Jean-de Maurienne and of Tarentaise, a group of ecclesiastical jurisdictions comprising almost the entirety of the province of Savoie that have been united under a single prelate since 1966. He was installed in Chambéry on 27 August, in Maurienne on 2 September, and in Tarentaise on 9 September.

On 5 July 2025, Pope Leo XIV named him president of the Pontifical Commission for the Protection of Minors. As he accepted this appointment, Verny emphasized the need for cultural sensitivity in working with episcopal conferences, especially those with limited resources, to establish a common culture to safeguard youth. He also promised the Catholics of Savoie that he was fully committed to them.
