= Peter of Tarentaise =

Peter of Tarentaise or Pierre de Tarentaise may refer to:

- Peter I of Tarentaise, archbishop (1132–1140) and popular saint; see Tiglieto Abbey
- Peter II of Tarentaise, archbishop (1142–1174), Cistercian abbot and canonized saint
- Pope Innocent V (c. 1225–1276), born Peter of Tarentaise
