= Peter II of Tarentaise =

French Roman Catholic saint

Saint Pierre de Tarentaise O. Cist.
- Archbishop of Tarentaise
- Church: Roman Catholic Church
- Archdiocese: Tarentaise
- See: Tarentaise
- Appointed: September 1141
- Term ended: 14 September 1174
- Predecessor: Bozon
- Successor: Isdrael

Orders
- Consecration: 1141
- Rank: Archbishop

Personal details
- Born: Pierre; 1102 Saint-Maurice-l'Exil, Kingdom of France
- Died: 14 September 1174 (aged 72) Bellevaux Abbey, Cirey, Franche-Comté, Kingdom of France

Sainthood
- Feast day: 14 September; 8 May (Tarentaise)
- Venerated in: Roman Catholic Church
- Canonized: 10 May 1191; Old Saint Peter's Basilica, Rome, Papal States by Pope Celestine III
- Attributes: Episcopal attire; Cistercian habit
- Patronage: Tarentaise

Peter (1102 – 14 September 1174), usually known as Peter of Tarentaise (French: Pierre de Tarentaise), was a Cistercian monk who served as the archbishop of Tarentaise (as Peter II) from 1141 until his death.

In 1132, he founded Tamié Abbey as a daughter house of Bonnevaux Abbey. Peter tried to refuse an elevation to the episcopate though his superiors and Bernard of Clairvaux insisted that he accept the position. As archbishop, he had special care for the poor, the ill, and those who traveled the Alpine passes.

Peter died in 1174 as he attempted to mediate between feuding monarchs after a serious but brief illness. Miracles were reported at his tomb after his death and this led Pope Celestine III to canonize Peter as a saint in mid-1191.

== Life ==
Peter was born in 1102 on a farm near Saint-Maurice-l'Exil, not far from the Cistercian Bonnevaux Abbey. His father often offered hospitality to the monks when they had to leave the monastery on business.

In 1122, he joined the Cistercians at Bonnevaux and was soon followed by his father and his brothers Lambert and Andrew. His mother and sister joined the Cistercian nuns at Saint Paul d'Izeaux.

The Archbishop of Tarentaise, (also named Peter, and the first Cistercian raised to the episcopate), and Amadeus III, Count of Savoy wished to establish a shelter for pilgrims and travelers along the old Roman road from Vienne to Milan. In 1132, Peter, his abbot, and twelve other monks founded Tamié Abbey in a defile of the Bauges mountains, as a daughter house of Bonnevaux. Once Abbot John was satisfied that the monks had adequate shelter, he returned to Bonnevaux, leaving Peter as abbot of the new monastery. Peter enjoyed humbly serving and conversing with the strangers who sought the hospitality of the monks.

In 1142, at the insistence of his superiors including Bernard of Clairvaux, Peter reluctantly accepted the position as the Archbishop of Tarentaise. In his episcopal role, he applied the Cistercian principles he had learned as an abbot to restore the diocese and met with a good deal of success since the diocese's management had declined and discipline lax. He removed corrupt priests (and elevated good priests to important pastoral positions) and promoted education for all the faithful. On two occasions of severe inclement weather he gave away his cloak to someone in need. He visited all parts of his mountainous diocese on a regular basis.

His specific concerns included the welfare of travelers to and from Switzerland and from the Italian cities. He rebuilt a hospice in poor repair at Little St. Bernard Pass. He also founded a charity which distributed food to farms in the surrounding hills. This would become known as pain de Mai and became a tradition continued in the region until the French Revolution. Yet he longed for the simple and pious life of a monk. In 1155 he disappeared and was later found as a lay brother in a remote convent in Switzerland. After about a year, when the monks discovered who he was, they alerted the archdiocese. Peter was reluctant to emerge from his newfound solitude but was welcomed back into his archdiocese with much enthusiasm on the part of the people. He also frequently visited the Grand Chartreuse, during the tenure of Hugh of Lincoln.

On one occasion Pope Eugene III in 1153 asked him to mediate a feud between the lords at La Chambre and the Bishop of Maurienne. Pope Adrian IV also asked him to resolve a dispute between some monks. It was he who upheld Pope Alexander III against Emperor Frederick Barbarossa and the Antipope Victor IV, and maintained in obedience to Alexander III the seven hundred abbeys of the Cistercian Order. He travelled to Lorraine and Alsace to ask the faithful to remain steadfast in their loyalty to Alexander III. Because of these efforts he was later appointed to assist in negotiations between King Louis VII and King Henry II. He died while doing so at Bellevaux on 14 September 1174 after a brief illness. He was succeeded by Aymon de Briançon.

== Veneration ==
For his charity and healing powers, Peter was viewed as a saint even in his lifetime. His canonization was formalized under Pope Celestine III in 1191.

== See also ==
- Roman Catholic Ancient Diocese of Tarentaise
