= Chambéry Cathedral =

Catholic church in Savoie, France

Cathedral of Saint Francis de Sales Cathédrale Saint-François-de-Sales
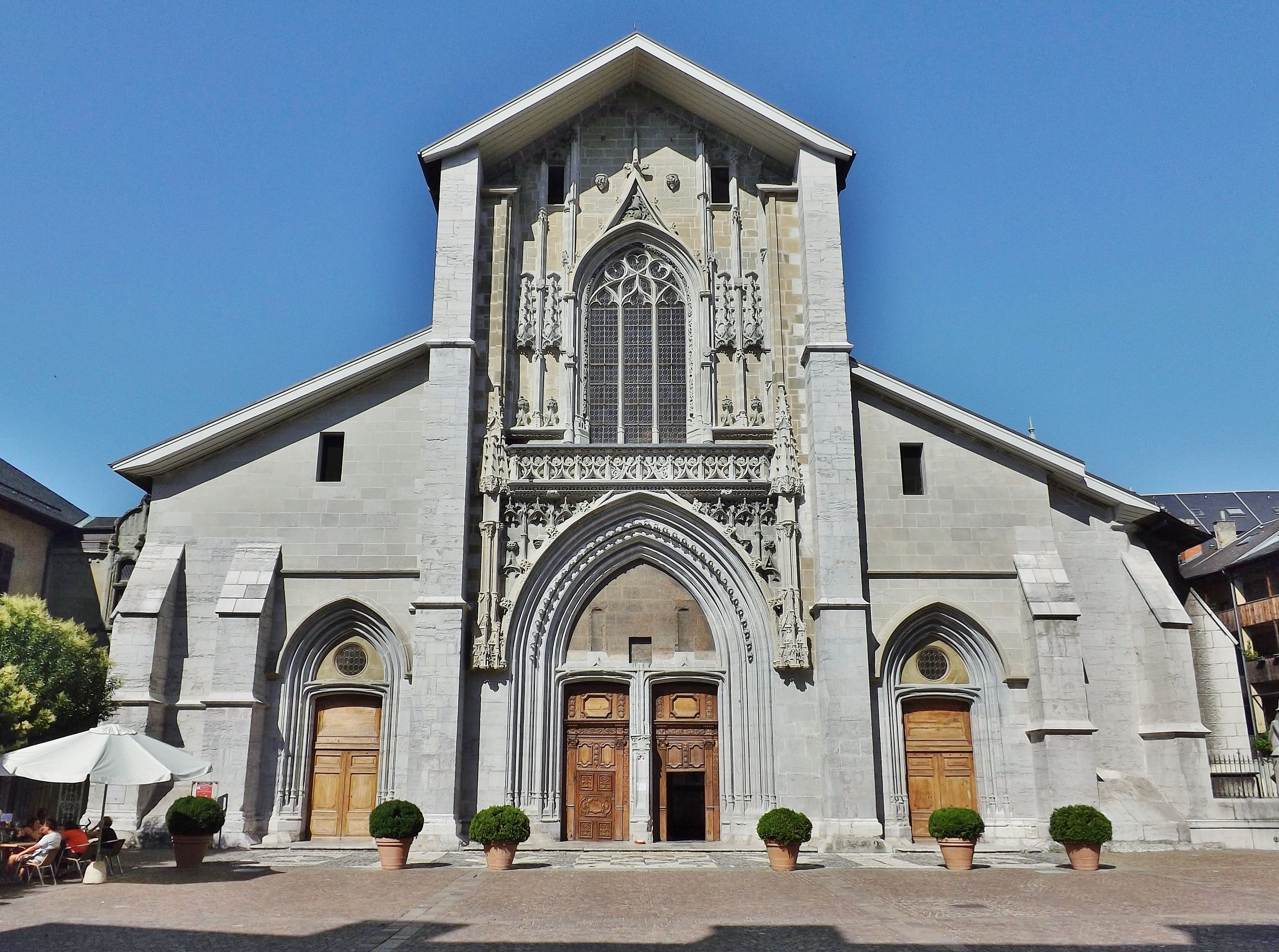
- Chambéry Cathedral

Religion
- Affiliation: Catholic Church
- Diocese: Archdiocese of Chambéry, Saint-Jean-de-Maurienne, and Tarentaise
- Rite: Catholic
- Ecclesiastical or organizational status: Cathedral

Location
- Location: Chambéry, France
- Interactive map of Cathedral of Saint Francis de Sales; Cathédrale Saint-François-de-Sales
- Coordinates: 45°33′55″N 5°55′23″E

Architecture
- Type: Church
- Style: Gothic, Byzantine

Chambéry Cathedral (French: Cathédrale Saint-François-de-Sales de Chambéry) is a Catholic church in Chambéry, France. The cathedral is dedicated to Saint François de Sales, and is the seat of the Archbishopric of Chambéry, Saint-Jean-de-Maurienne, and Tarentaise.

The Chambéry Cathedral was established in 1779 as the Bishopric of Chambéry. After gaining the territories of the Bishopric of Saint-Jean-de-Maurienne and the Archbishopric of Tarentaise in 1801, it was elevated to an archbishopric in 1817. In 1825 Saint-Jean-de-Maurienne and Tarentaise were re-created as independent dioceses; in 1966 they were once again added to the Archdiocese of Chambéry, which in 2002 adopted its present name of Archdiocese of Chambéry, Saint-Jean-de-Maurienne, and Tarentaise.

The building dates from the 15th century, when it was constructed as a Franciscan chapel. The site is very swampy and the building is supported by 30,000 poles. It became the cathedral on the creation of the see in 1779. During the French Revolution it was extensively defaced, and the interior was entirely restored in the early 19th century.

It contains the largest ensemble of trompe-l'œil painting in Europe (almost 6,000 m^{2}) by the artists Sevesi and Vicario, as well as a maze almost 35 metres long laid down in 1860–1870 and relaid in 1989.

The neighbouring local history museum, formerly the Franciscan convent, linked to the cathedral by the cloisters, houses a 12th-century ivory diptych of Byzantine inspiration.

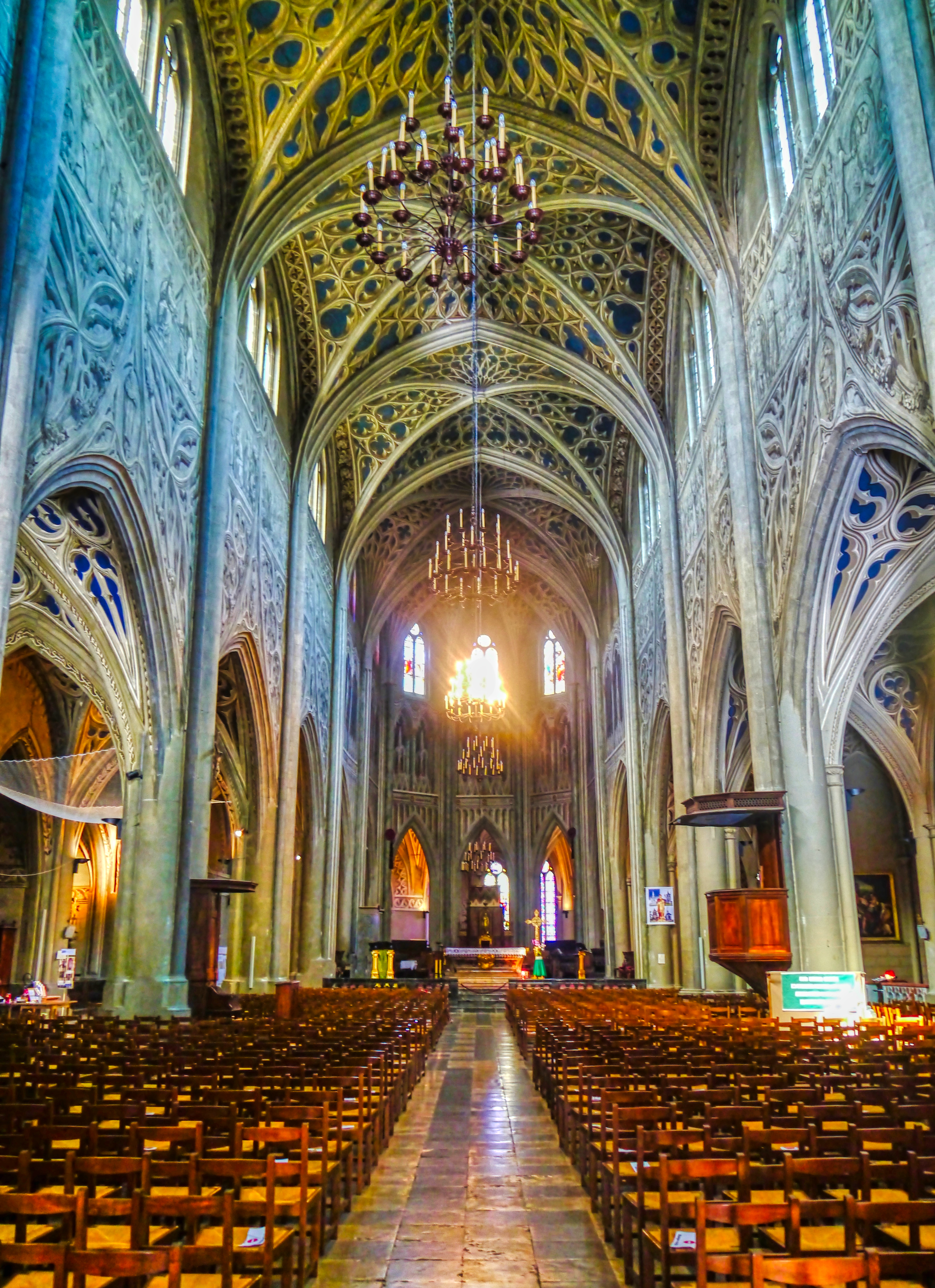
The interior

== Sources ==
- Catholic Hierarchy: Archdiocese of Chambéry
- Catholic Encyclopedia: Chambéry
- (in French) Cathedral history
- Maze
