= Saint-André, Savoie =

Saint-André
- Commune
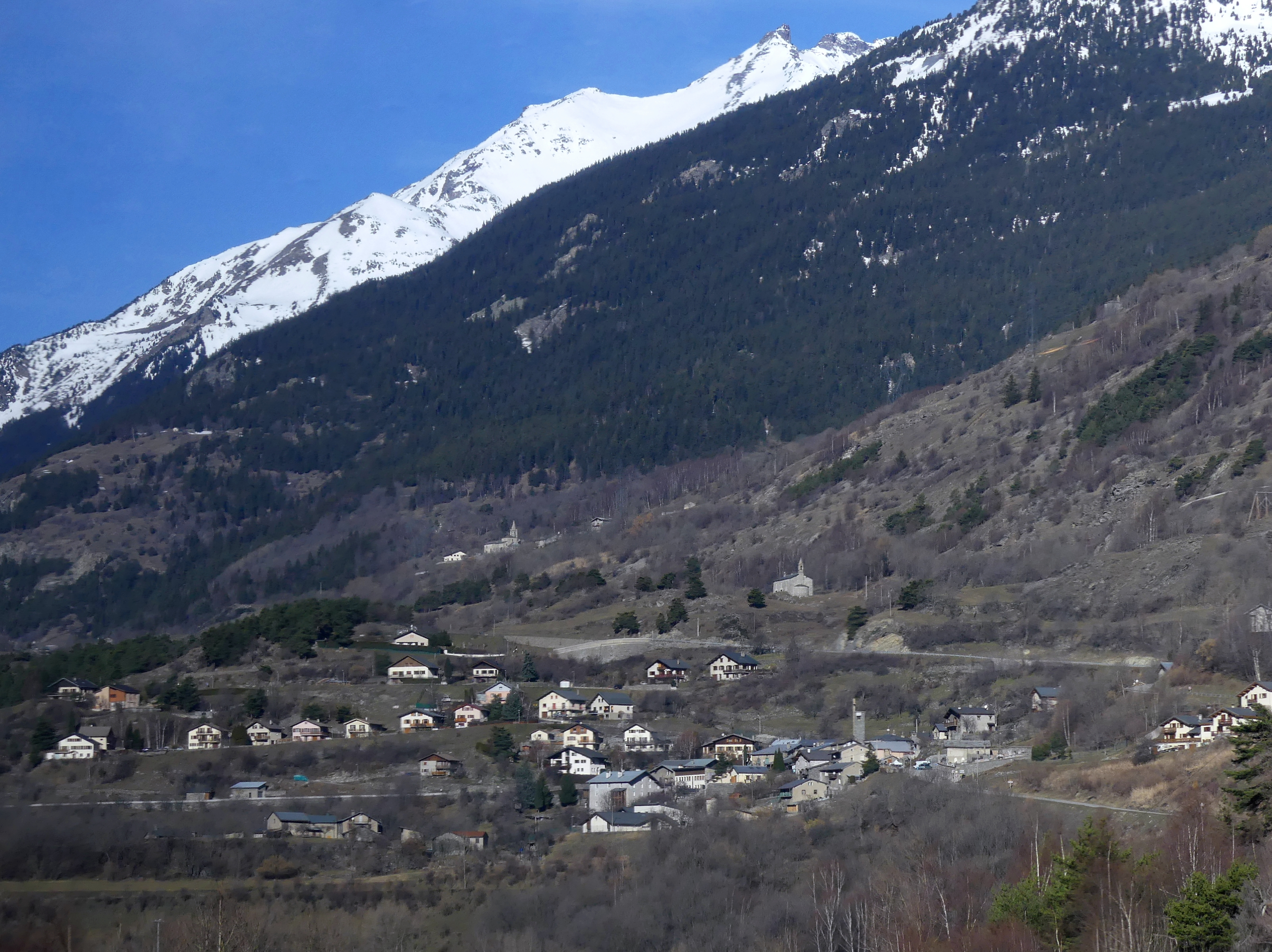
- Saint-André in the Maurienne valley.
- Location of Saint-André
- Location within France Location within Auvergne-Rhône-Alpes
- Coordinates: 45°12′07″N 6°37′11″E
- Country: France
- Region: Auvergne-Rhône-Alpes
- Department: Savoie
- Arrondissement: Saint-Jean-de-Maurienne
- Canton: Modane

Government
  - Mayor (2020–2026): Christian Chiale
- Area^{1}: 30.84 km^{2} (11.91 sq mi)
- Highest elevation: 3,400 m (11,200 ft)
- Lowest elevation: 931 m (3,054 ft)
- Population (2023): 449
  - Density: 14.6/km^{2} (37.7/sq mi)
- Time zone: UTC+01:00 (CET)
  - Summer (DST): UTC+02:00 (CEST)
- INSEE/Postal code: 73223 /73500
- ^{1} French Land Register data, which excludes lakes, ponds, glaciers > 1 km^{2} (0.386 sq mi or 247 acres) and river estuaries.

Saint-André (French pronunciation: [sɛ̃.t‿ɑ̃dʁe]; Arpitan: Sant-André) is a commune in the Savoie department in the Auvergne-Rhône-Alpes region in south-eastern France.

== See also ==
- Communes of the Savoie department
