= Cirey =

- Commune
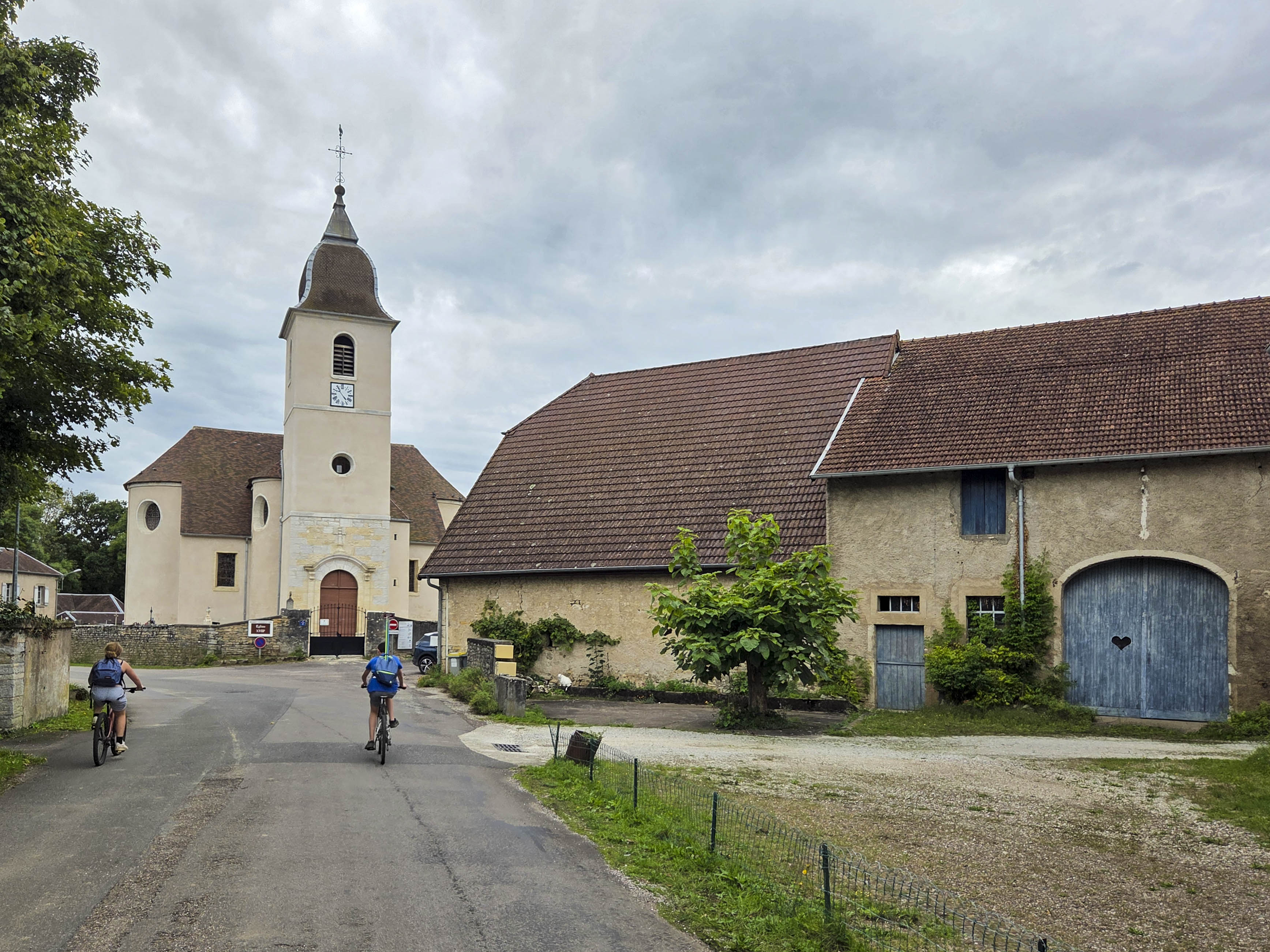
- The village centre and Saint-Maurice church.
- Location of Cirey
- Location within France Location within Bourgogne-Franche-Comté
- Coordinates: 47°23′50″N 6°07′59″E
- Country: France
- Region: Bourgogne-Franche-Comté
- Department: Haute-Saône
- Arrondissement: Vesoul
- Canton: Rioz

Government
  - Mayor (2023–2026): Christine Moine
- Area^{1}: 13.09 km^{2} (5.05 sq mi)
- Highest elevation: 239 m (784 ft)
- Lowest elevation: 222 m (728 ft)
- Population (2023): 372
  - Density: 28.4/km^{2} (73.6/sq mi)
- Time zone: UTC+01:00 (CET)
  - Summer (DST): UTC+02:00 (CEST)
- INSEE/Postal code: 70154 /70190
- ^{1} French Land Register data, which excludes lakes, ponds, glaciers > 1 km^{2} (0.386 sq mi or 247 acres) and river estuaries.

Cirey (French pronunciation: [siʁɛ]) is a commune in the Haute-Saône department in the region of Bourgogne-Franche-Comté in eastern France.

== See also ==
- Bellevaux Abbey
- Communes of the Haute-Saône department
