= Moûtiers Cathedral =

Roman Catholic church in Moûtiers en Tarentaise, France

Coordinates: 45°28′59″N 6°32′1″E

Moûtiers Cathedral Cathédrale Saint-Pierre de Moûtiers
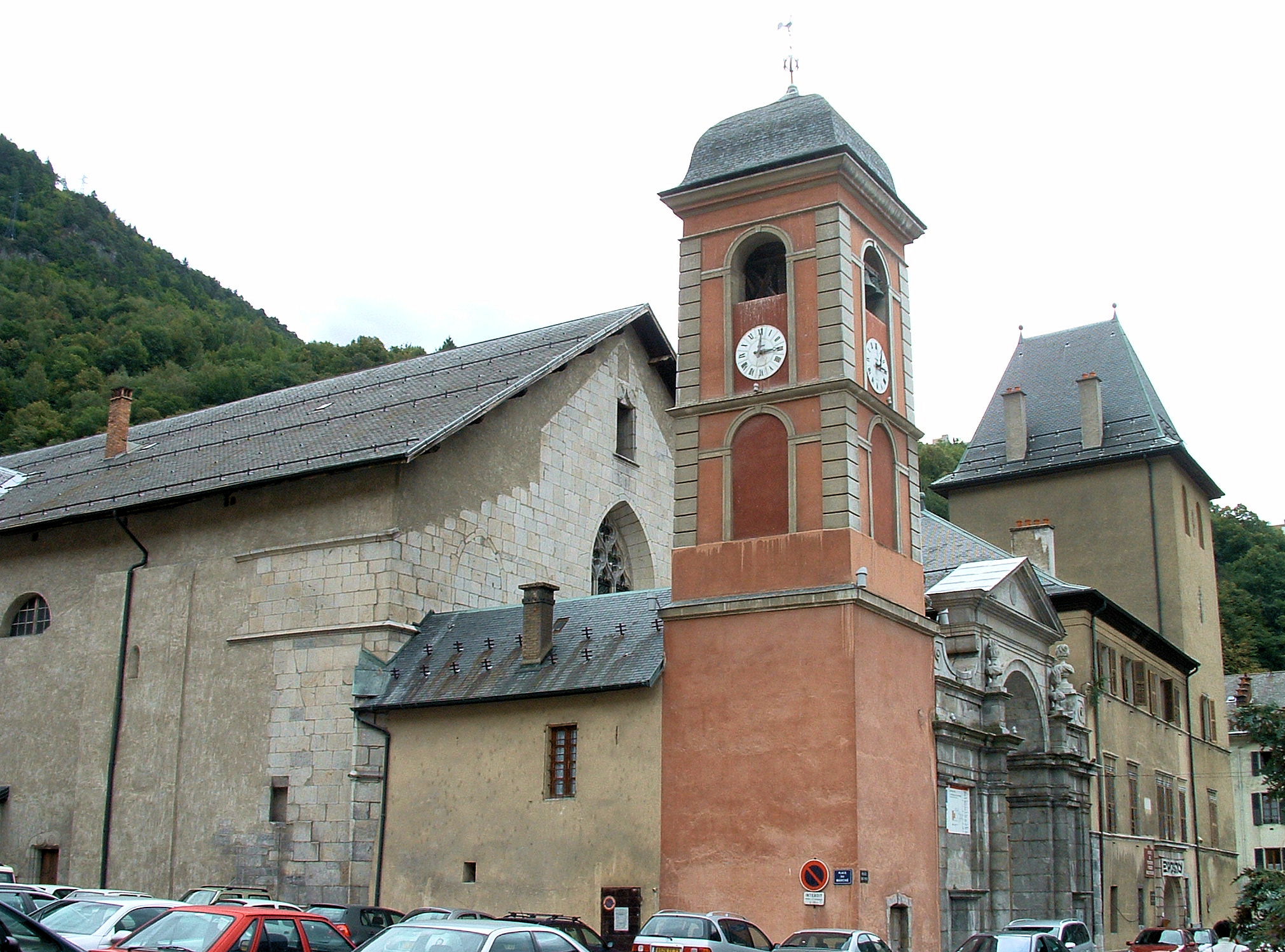
- Moûtiers Cathedral

Religion
- Affiliation: Roman Catholic Church
- Province: Archdiocese of Chambéry, Maurienne and Tarentaise
- Region: Savoie
- Rite: Roman
- Ecclesiastical or organisational status: Cathedral
- Status: Active

Location
- Location: Moûtiers, France
- Interactive map of Moûtiers Cathedral; Cathédrale Saint-Pierre de Moûtiers

Architecture
- Type: church
- Style: Romanesque, Gothic

Moûtiers Cathedral (French: Cathédrale Saint-Pierre de Moûtiers) is a Roman Catholic church in Moûtiers en Tarentaise, France. The cathedral is a national monument, and was formerly the seat of the Archdiocese of Tarentaise, which was abolished under the Concordat of 1801. It was afterwards the seat of the re-formed Bishopric of Tarentaise from 1825 until 1966, when the diocese of Tarentaise, Diocese of Saint-Jean-de-Maurienne and the Archdiocese of Chambéry were amalgamated to form the present Archdiocese of Chambéry, Maurienne and Tarentaise.

== Sources ==
- Catholic Encyclopedia: Tarentaise
- Diocese of Tarentaise
