= Cardinal of Tarentaise =

The Cardinal of Tarentaise may refer to:

- Jean d'Arces (d. 1454), Archbishop of Tarentaise 1438–54, Cardinal 1449-54
- Cristoforo della Rovere (1434–78), Archbishop of Tarentaise 1472–78, Cardinal 1477-78
