= Archdiocese of Chambéry–Saint-Jean-de-Maurienne–Tarentaise =

Catholic archdiocese in France

Coordinates: 45°34′00″N 5°55′16″E

Archdiocese of Chambéry, Saint-Jean-de-Maurienne, and Tarentaise Archidioecesis Camberiensis, Maruianensis et Tarantasiensis Archidiocèse de Chambéry, Saint-Jean-de-Maurienne et Tarentaise

Catholic
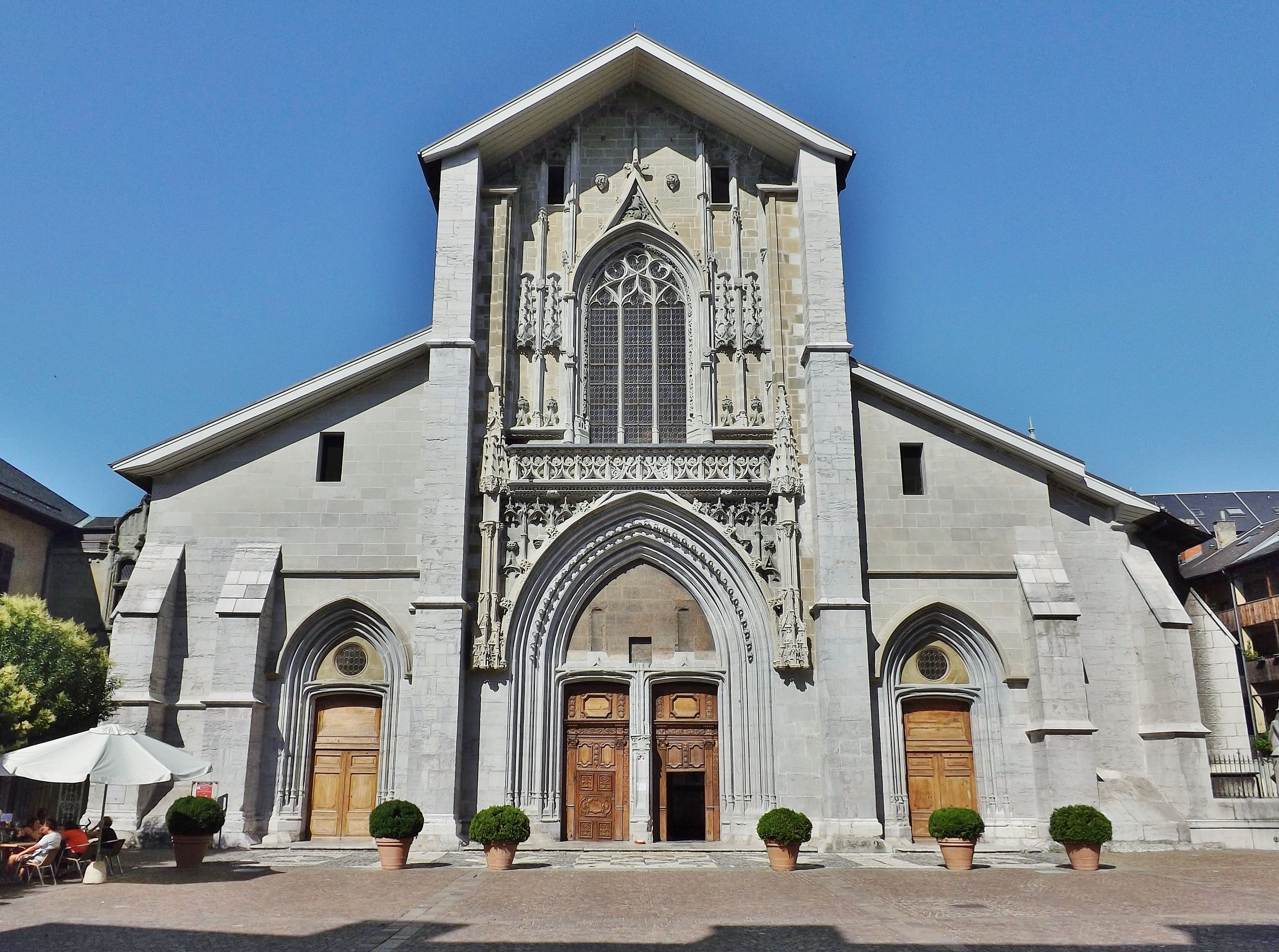
- Chambéry Cathedral

Location
- Country: France
- Ecclesiastical province: Lyon
- Metropolitan: Archdiocese of Lyon

Statistics
- Area: 7,460 km^{2} (2,880 sq mi)
- Population: Total; Catholics: (as of 2021); 454,000 (est.)▲; 399,425▲ (88.0▼%)
- Parishes: 141

Information
- Denomination: Roman Catholic
- Sui iuris church: Latin Church
- Rite: Roman Rite
- Established: 18 August 1779 (Diocese of Chambery); 18 July 1817 (Archdiocese of Chambery); 26 April 1966 (Chambéry-Saint-Jean-de-Maurienne-Tarentaise)
- Cathedral: Cathedral Basilica of St. Francis de Sales in Chambéry
- Co-cathedral: Co-Cathedral of St. John the Baptist in Saint-Jean-de-Maurienne; Co-Cathedral of St. Peter in Moûtiers
- Patron saint: Saint Francis de Sales; Saint John the Baptist; Saint Peter and Saint Paul
- Secular priests: 75 ▼40 (Religious Orders) ▲30 Permanent Deacons ▲

Current leadership
- Pope: Leo XIV
- Archbishop: Thibault Verny
- Metropolitan Archbishop: Olivier de Germay

Map

Website
- Website of the Archdiocese

The Archdiocese of Chambéry, Saint-Jean-de-Maurienne, and Tarentaise (Latin: Archidioecesis Camberiensis, Maruianensis et Tarantasiensis; French: Archidiocèse de Chambéry, Saint-Jean-de-Maurienne et Tarentaise) is a complex of three jurisdictions of the Catholic Church in France that have, since 1966, been united in the person of a single prelate who is titled Archbishop of Chambéry, Bishop of Maurienne, and Bishop of Tarentaise. All three are suffragans of the Archdiocese of Lyon. The archepiscopal see of Chambéry is Chambéry Cathedral. The complex encompasses the department of Savoie, in the Region of Rhône-Alpes.

Though sometimes referred to as a single archdiocese, the three jurisdictions are distinct, and the prelate appointed as their head is installed in each in a separate ceremony.

== History ==
In 1467, Pope Paul II erected a chapter of canons in the ducal chapel in the Chateau de Chambéry, built for the relic which became known as the Shroud of Turin (Santo Sudario) by Amadeus IX of Savoy, and the Duchess Yolande of France, The Chapter of twelve canons, headed by a dean, a cantor, and a treasurer, was directly subject to the Holy See. Pope Paul's successor Pope Sixtus IV, on 21 May 1474, issued a bull, "Ex supernae providentia", which assigned the territory of the deanery of Savoy in the diocese of Grenoble to the Chapter of the chapel of the chateau. He also created a new dignity in the Chapter, that of the archdeacon.

The purported relic known as the Holy Shroud of Christ was kept at Chambéry until 1598, in which year Charles Emmanuel I, Duke of Savoy, had it transported to Turin, where St. Charles Borromeo wished to venerate it.

On 6 June 1515, Pope Leo X published a papal bull making the deanery an archbishopric, and giving Duke Charles of Savoy the right to nominate the archbishop, subject to papal approval. But Francis I of France, the Archbishop of Lyon, and the Bishop of Grenoble all objected, and on 22 September 1516, Pope Leo was obliged to cancel the establishment of Chambéry as an archdiocese. It was only in 1775 that this deanery was separated from the Diocese of Grenoble by Pope Pius VI, who, in 1779, created it a bishopric with the see at Chambéry.

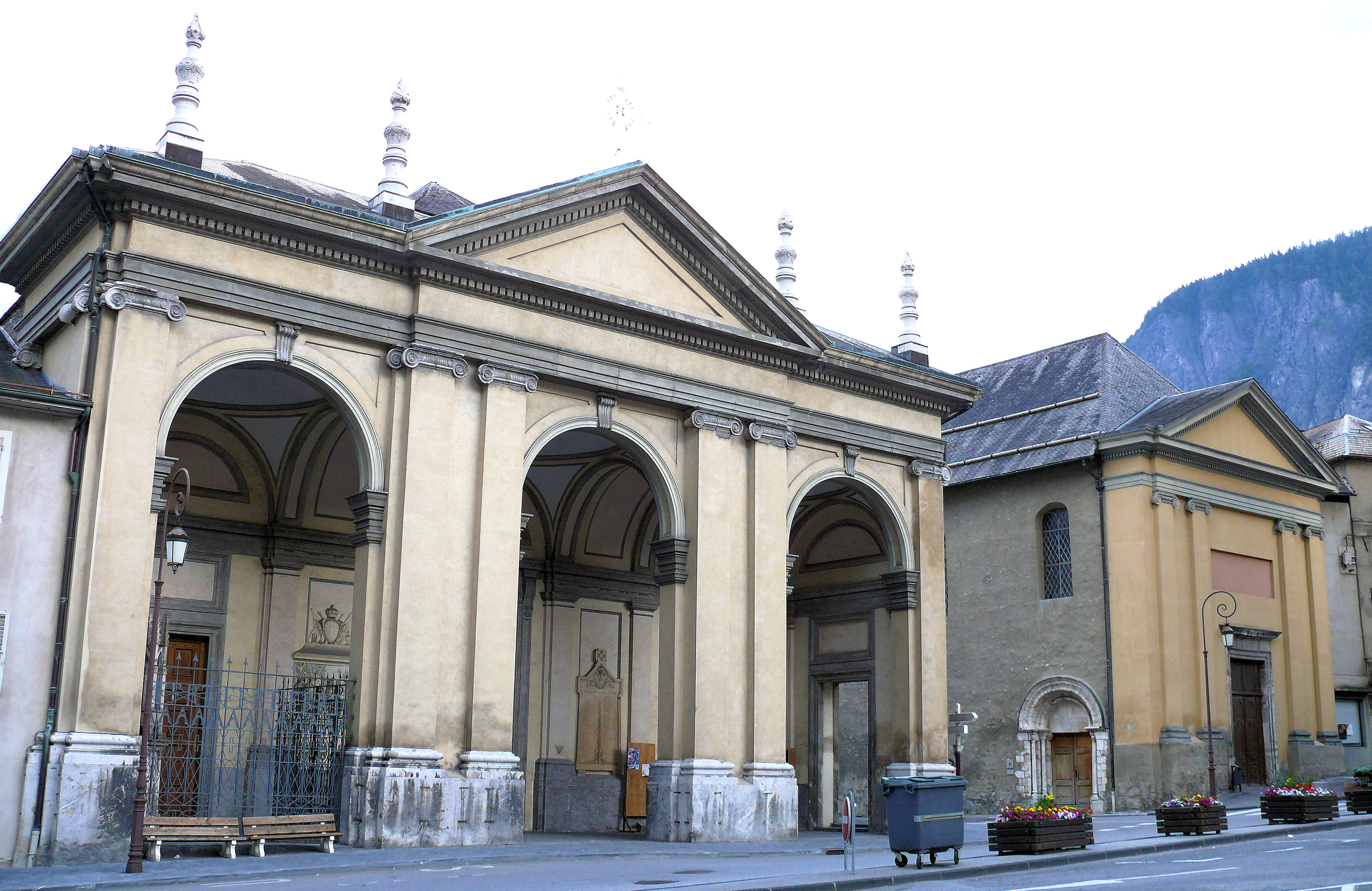
Co-Cathedral of St. John the Baptist in Saint-Jean-de-Maurienne

The Duchy of Savoy, whose sovereign was also the King of Sardinia, had thenceforth four bishoprics: Chambéry, the diocese of Saint-Jean de Maurienne, the diocese of Tarentaise, and Geneva (whose bishop, excluded from the city of Geneva by the Protestants, resided in the city of Annecy.

=== French Revolution ===
In October, 1792, the commissaries to the Convention formed the constitutional "Diocese of Mont-Blanc", with Annecy as the see and Lyon as the metropolitan. The four Savoyard dioceses were suppressed. The election of a new constitutional bishop was ordered. On 8 February 1793, they published a proclamation concerning the religious affairs of the constitutional diocese, which was in fact the local application of the provisions of the Civil Constitution of the Clergy of 1789. Each member of the clergy was required to swear an oath to the Constitution or be deported from French territory; an exception was made for clerics over sixty years of age. Bishop Conseil refused the oath. He was 77, and therefore escaped deportation, but was placed under house arrest in his episcopal palace, where he died on 29 September 1793. Unaware of the bishop's death, Pope Pius VI wrote a letter on 5 October 1793, commiserating with and encouraging the cathedral Chapter of Chambéry in their sufferings, and warning them of the dangers of schism.

Under severe pressure from First Consul Napoleon Bonaparte, Pope Pius VII issued the bull "Qui Christi Domini vices" on 29 November 1801. The bull first abolished all the metropolitan archdioces and dioceses in France, and then recreated fifty of them, arranged in ten metropolitan ecclesiastical districts; the others were suppressed. In the metropolitanate of Lyon, the pope created suffragan dioceses of Mende, Grenoble, Valence, and Chambéry.

The Concordat of 1802 created a Diocese of Chambéry, and suppressed the Diocese of Geneva, annexing its territory to the new Diocese of Chambéry. Chambéry was made a suffragan of the archdiocese of Lyon.

=== Restoration ===
The Bull "Beati Petri," signed by Pope Pius VII on 17 July 1817, made Chambéry, which had been assigned to the Kingdom of Sardinia (1720–1861) by the Congress of Vienna, the seat of an archdiocese, with the diocese of Aosta as a suffragan.

The canton of Geneva had also been declared independent of France, and had allied itself with several Swiss cantons. On 20 September 1819, Pope Pius VII signed the bull "Inter Multiplices", which removed the territory of the former diocese of Geneva and assigned it to the diocese of Lausanne. The title of "Bishop of Geneva", however, remained with the archbishops of Chambéry.

Bishop Alexis Billiet (1840–1873) held a diocesan synod in the chapel of the seminary on 20–22 September 1841. Its constitutions were published,

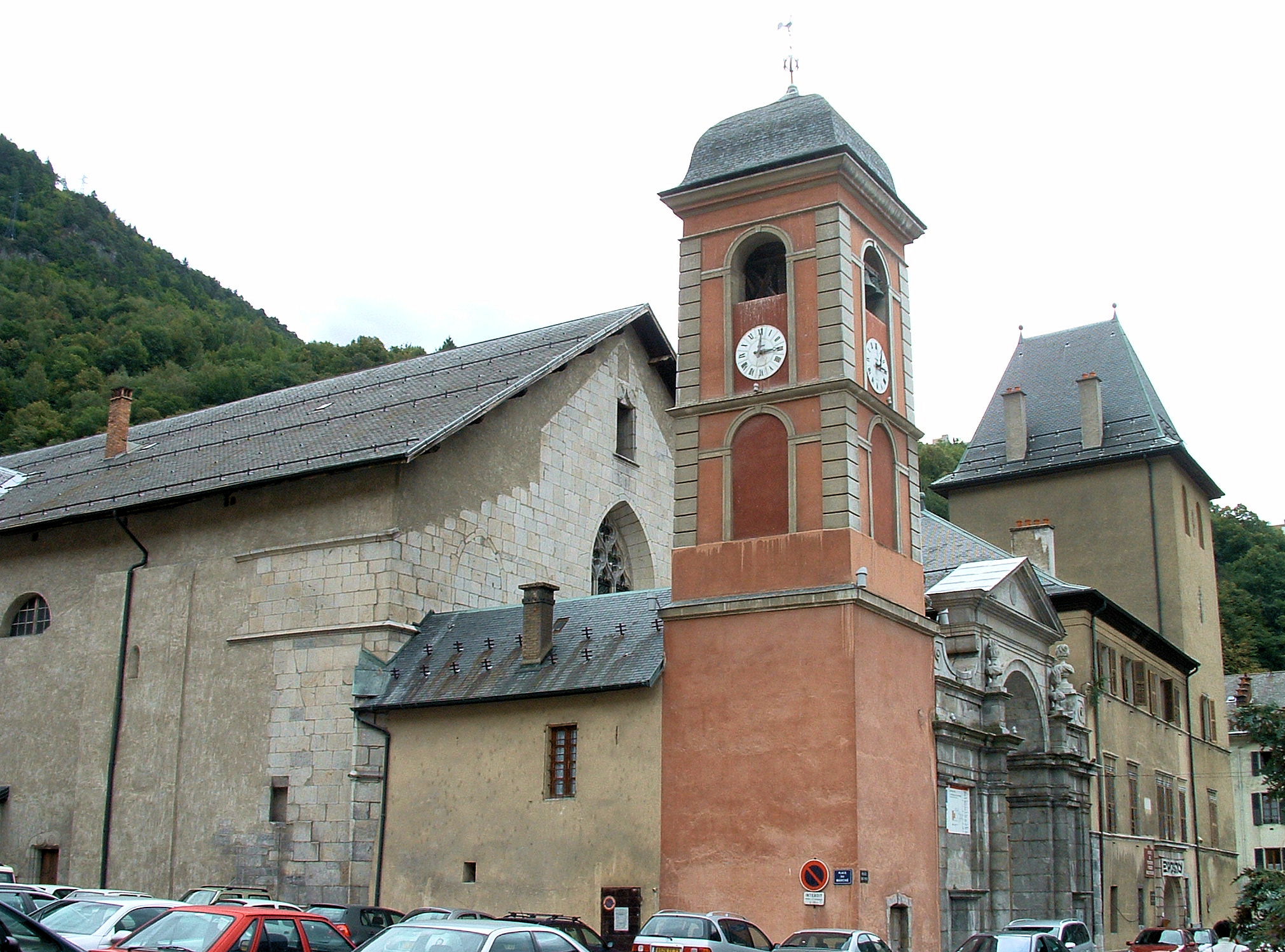
Co-Cathedral of St. Peter in Moûtiers

The Dioceses of Annecy (re-established in 1822), Saint-Jean-Maurienne, and Tarentaise (in 1825), soon also became suffragans of Chambéry.

In 1860, the French Empire and the Kingdom of Sardinia (Piedmont) agreed to allow France to annex the duchy of Savoy, including Chambéry, St.Jean de Maurienne, Annecy, Tarentaise, and Nice. This created an anomaly, from the point of view of national governments, that the Diocese of Aosta in the Kingdom of Sardinia had been a suffragan of the archbishop of Chambéry, in France, since 1819. Napoleon III therefore petitioned Pope Pius IX to adjust the borders of dioceses and ecclesiastical provinces, making Aosta a suffragan of the archdiocese of Turin. The pope did so, with bad grace, on 1 December 1862.

On 26 April 1966, Pope Paul VI issued the apostolic constitution "Animorum Bonum", in which he combined the dioceses of Maurienne and Tarantaise with the archdiocese of Chambéry, aeque personaliter; each diocese maintained its individual and distinct existence, but the archbishop was the bishop of all three dioceses at the same time. This was intended to be a permanent arrangement.

In June 2002, the synodial assembly authorized the regrouping of 360 parishes into 47 "ensembles paroissiaux."

On 16 December 2002 the Archdiocese of Chambéry became a suffragan of the Archdiocese of Lyon and ceased to be a Metropolitan archbishopric.

==== Religious Institutions ====
The Cistercian Abbey of Hautecombe, founded in 1135, is one of the burial places of the House of Savoy. The church of Notre-Dame de Myans (antedating the twelfth century), where Francis de Sales officiated; and Notre-Dame de l'Aumone at Rumilly (thirteenth century), whither Francis I of France went as a pilgrim, are still places of pilgrimage.

The Sisters of St. Joseph, an order devoted to teaching and charitable work, established a house, which became a mother-house, at Chambéry in 1812.

== Bishop ==
- 1780–1793 Michel Conseil

== Archbishops ==
- 1802–1805, René de Moustier de Mérinville
- 1805–1823, Irénée-Yves Desolle
- 1824–1827, François-Marie Bigex
- 1828–1839, Antoine Martinet
- 1840–1873, Cardinal Alexis Billiet
- 1873–1880, Pierre-Athanase Pichenot
- 1881–1893, François-Albert Leuillieux
- 1893–1907, François Hautin
- April–August, 1907, Gustave-Adolphe de Pélacot
- 1907–1914, Cardinal François-Virgile Dubillard
- 1915–1936, Dominique Castellan
- 1937–1947, Pierre-Marie Durieux
- 1947–1966 Louis-Marie-Fernand de Bazelaire de Ruppierre
- 1966–1985, André Bontemps
- 1985–2000, Claude Feidt
- 2000–2008, Laurent Ulrich
- 2009–2022, Philippe Ballot
- 2023−present Thibault Verny

== See also ==
- Cathédrale Saint-François-de-Sales de Chambéry
- Diocese of Annecy
- Roman Catholic Diocese of Saint-Jean-de-Maurienne
- Ancient Diocese of Tarentaise
- Catholic Church in France
- Deanery of Savoy

== Bibliography ==
=== Reference works ===
- Gams, Pius Bonifatius (1873). Series episcoporum Ecclesiae catholicae: quotquot innotuerunt a beato Petro apostolo. Ratisbon: Typis et Sumptibus Georgii Josephi Manz. (Use with caution; obsolete)
- Ritzler, Remigius; Sefrin, Pirminus (1952). Hierarchia catholica medii et recentis aevi (in Latin). Vol. V (1667-1730). Patavii: Messagero di S. Antonio.
- Ritzler, Remigius; Sefrin, Pirminus (1958). Hierarchia catholica medii et recentis aevi (in Latin). Vol. VI (1730-1799). Patavii: Messagero di S. Antonio.
- Ritzler, Remigius; Sefrin, Pirminus (1968). Hierarchia Catholica medii et recentioris aevi (in Latin). Vol. VII (1800–1846). Monasterii: Libr. Regensburgiana.
- Remigius Ritzler; Pirminus Sefrin (1978). Hierarchia catholica Medii et recentioris aevi (in Latin). Vol. VIII (1846–1903). Il Messaggero di S. Antonio.
- Pięta, Zenon (2002). Hierarchia catholica medii et recentioris aevi (in Latin). Vol. IX (1903–1922). Padua: Messagero di San Antonio. ISBN 978-88-250-1000-8.

=== Studies ===
- Billiet, Alexis (1865). Mémoires pour servir à l'histoire ecclésiastique du diocèse de Chambéry. (in French). Chambéry: F. Puthod, 1865.
- Hauréau, Jean-Barthélemy (1865). Gallia christiana. (in Latin). vol. XVI, Paris 1865.
- Jean, Armand (1891). Les évêques et les archevêques de France depuis 1682 jusqu'à 1801 (in French). Paris: A. Picard.
- Karmin, Otto (1920). Le transfert de Chambéry à Fribourg de l'Evêché de Genève (1815-1819): recueil de documents tirés des Archives suisses. (in French). Genève: Impr. centrale, 1920.
- Jussieu, A. de (1868). La Sainte-Chapelle du château de Chambéry. (in French and Latin). Chambéry: Perrin, 1868.
- Lovie, Jacques (1979). Les Diocèses de Chambéry, Tarentaise, Maurienne. (in French). Paris: Editions Beauchesne, 1979. [Histoire des Diocèses de France. Volume 11].
- Pelletier, Victor (1864). Des chapitres cathédraux en France devant l'Église et devant l'État. (in French). Paris: J. Lecoffre, 1864.
- Sorrel, Christian (1995). Les catholiques savoyards: histoire du diocèse de Chambéry (1890-1940). (in French). La Fontaine de Siloë, 1995.
- [Nuns of the Carmel of Chambéry]. Le Carmel de Chambéry: fondation de très haute princesse Marie-Liesse de Luxembourg, duchesse de Ventadour, carmélite déchausée, 1634; souvenirs de la dispersion et chronique de la restauration, 1792-1892. (in French). Tournai: Impr. Notre-Dame des Près, 1910.
