= Moûtiers =

Moûtiers Motiérs (Savoyard)
- Commune
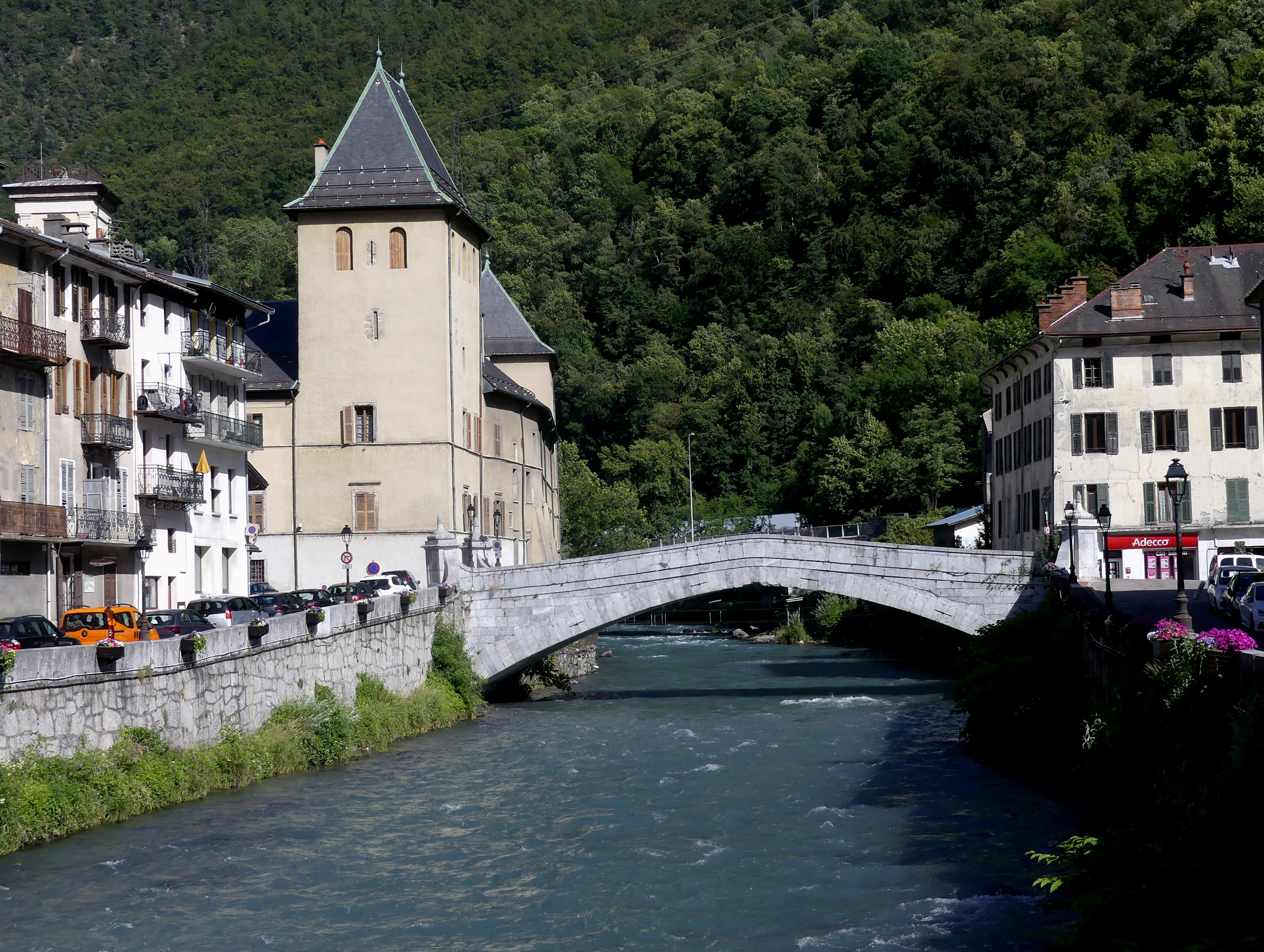
- View of the Isère in Moûtiers

- Coat of arms
- Location of Moûtiers
- Location within France Location within Auvergne-Rhône-Alpes
- Coordinates: 45°29′09″N 6°32′04″E
- Country: France
- Region: Auvergne-Rhône-Alpes
- Department: Savoie
- Arrondissement: Albertville
- Canton: Moûtiers

Government
  - Mayor (2024–2026): Chantal Martin
- Area^{1}: 3.16 km^{2} (1.22 sq mi)
- Elevation: 479 m (1,572 ft)
- Highest elevation: 1,042 m (3,419 ft)
- Lowest elevation: 465 m (1,526 ft)
- Population (2023): 3,487
  - Density: 1,100/km^{2} (2,860/sq mi)
- Time zone: UTC+01:00 (CET)
  - Summer (DST): UTC+02:00 (CEST)
- INSEE/Postal code: 73181 /73600
- Website: moutiers.org
- ^{1} French Land Register data, which excludes lakes, ponds, glaciers > 1 km^{2} (0.386 sq mi or 247 acres) and river estuaries.

Moûtiers (French pronunciation: [mutje]; Arpitan: Motiérs), historically also called Tarentaise, is a commune in the Savoie department in the Auvergne-Rhône-Alpes region in Southeastern France.

Moûtiers is the main access point to the Les Trois Vallées ski region in the French Alps. Its railway station, although not on a high-speed rail line, is consequently a seasonally important destination for TGV services from Lyon, Paris and elsewhere, including abroad.

The commune is listed as a Village étape.

== Geography ==
Moûtiers is located deep in the Tarentaise Valley. It is its geographic capital, between Albertville and Bourg-Saint-Maurice. Several popular French ski resorts are located in its vicinity. The Isère flows through the town.

=== Climate ===
Moûtiers has an oceanic climate (Köppen climate classification Cfb) closely bordering on a humid subtropical climate (Cfa). The average annual temperature in Moûtiers is 11.9 °C (53.4 °F). The average annual rainfall is 930.4 mm (36.63 in) with December as the wettest month. The temperatures are highest on average in July, at around 21.7 °C (71.1 °F), and lowest in January, at around 1.6 °C (34.9 °F). The highest temperature ever recorded in Moûtiers was 42.0 °C (107.6 °F) on 7 July 2015; the coldest temperature ever recorded was −18.2 °C (−0.8 °F) on 15 January 1966.

Climate data for Moûtiers (1991−2020 normals, extremes 1934−present)
Month	Jan	Feb	Mar	Apr	May	Jun	Jul	Aug	Sep	Oct	Nov	Dec	Year
Record high °C (°F)	16.5 (61.7)	22.5 (72.5)	28.1 (82.6)	32.0 (89.6)	36.0 (96.8)	38.0 (100.4)	42.0 (107.6)	41.0 (105.8)	34.0 (93.2)	29.1 (84.4)	23.2 (73.8)	19.0 (66.2)	42.0 (107.6)
Mean daily maximum °C (°F)	5.2 (41.4)	8.4 (47.1)	14.2 (57.6)	18.5 (65.3)	22.3 (72.1)	26.1 (79.0)	28.4 (83.1)	28.0 (82.4)	23.0 (73.4)	17.5 (63.5)	10.3 (50.5)	4.9 (40.8)	17.2 (63.0)
Daily mean °C (°F)	1.6 (34.9)	3.6 (38.5)	8.4 (47.1)	12.2 (54.0)	16.1 (61.0)	19.7 (67.5)	21.7 (71.1)	21.4 (70.5)	17.1 (62.8)	12.4 (54.3)	6.4 (43.5)	1.9 (35.4)	11.9 (53.4)
Mean daily minimum °C (°F)	−1.9 (28.6)	−1.1 (30.0)	2.6 (36.7)	5.9 (42.6)	9.8 (49.6)	13.2 (55.8)	15.0 (59.0)	14.8 (58.6)	11.3 (52.3)	7.3 (45.1)	2.4 (36.3)	−1.0 (30.2)	6.5 (43.7)
Record low °C (°F)	−18.2 (−0.8)	−17.0 (1.4)	−13.0 (8.6)	−5.5 (22.1)	−1.0 (30.2)	1.2 (34.2)	5.0 (41.0)	4.0 (39.2)	0.0 (32.0)	−4.5 (23.9)	−10.2 (13.6)	−18.0 (−0.4)	−18.2 (−0.8)
Average precipitation mm (inches)	96.7 (3.81)	70.6 (2.78)	73.3 (2.89)	58.6 (2.31)	78.8 (3.10)	74.7 (2.94)	77.2 (3.04)	74.0 (2.91)	64.8 (2.55)	75.3 (2.96)	79.6 (3.13)	106.8 (4.20)	930.4 (36.63)
Average precipitation days (≥ 1.0 mm)	9.1	7.7	8.3	8.2	10.3	9.8	8.9	9.1	8.2	9.1	8.9	9.8	107.5
Source: Météo-France

== History ==
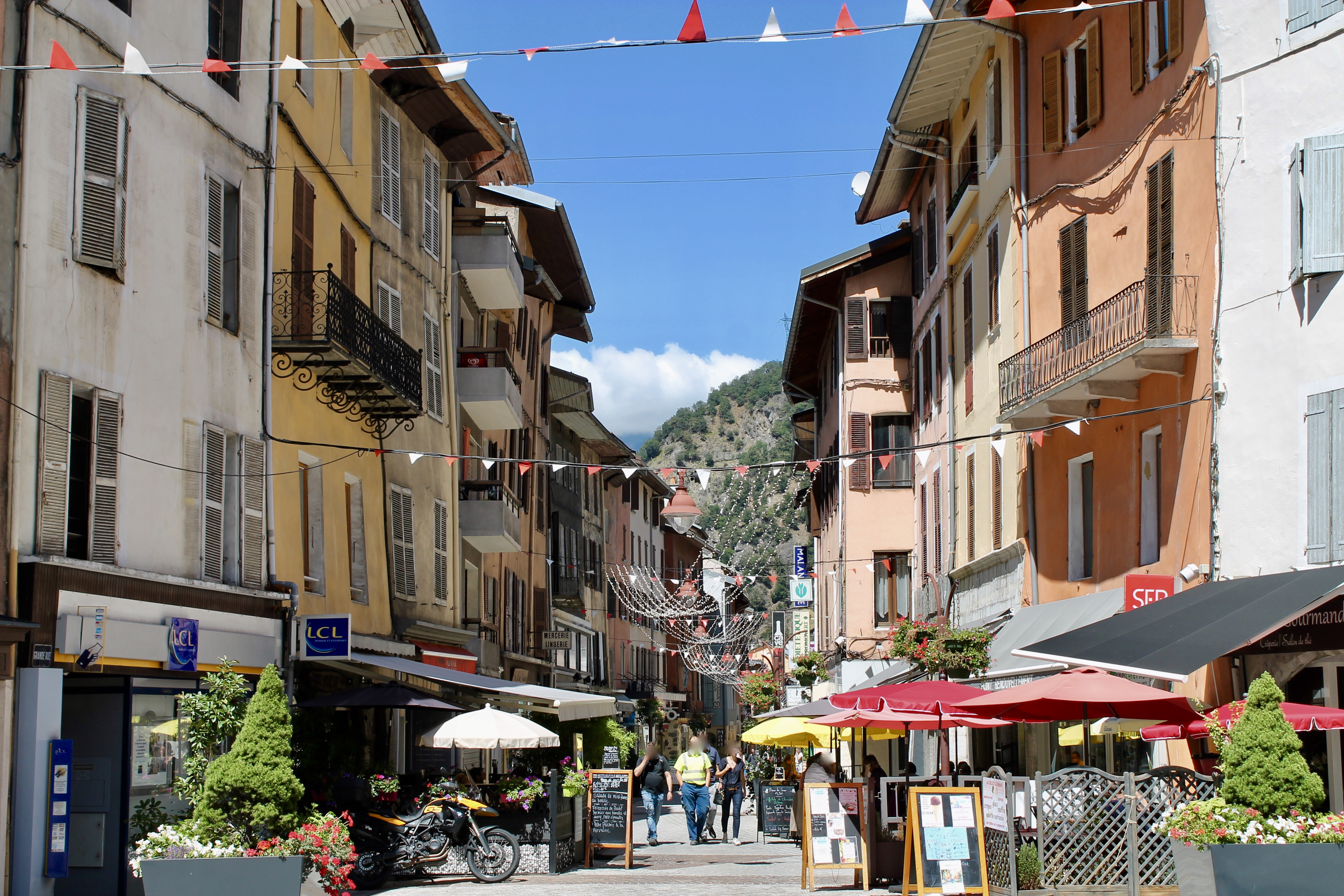
Grande Rue in the town centre

Moûtiers was the capital of the Ceutrones, a Celtic tribe of Gaul. Its antique name, Darantasia, appears on a surviving ancient Roman road map known as the Tabula Peutingeriana. In a medieval text dating from 996, Moûtiers was called Monasterium (root of the word "monastery") from which its later names, Moustiers and finally Moûtiers, were derived.

Moûtiers was the episcopal see of the Roman Catholic Archdiocese of Tarentaise. The archdiocese was disbanded in 1801; it was re-established as the Diocese of Tarentaise. This diocese was united with the Diocese of Chambéry and Diocese of St-Jean-de-Maurienne to form the Diocese of Chambéry, Maurienne and Tarentaise.

On 16 October 1793, in the course of the French Revolution, Moûtiers was renamed Mont-Salins following an order by Antoine Louis Albitte. On 3 January 1796, the name Moûtiers was restored. In 1814, the town was invaded by Sardinians. In 1893, Moûtiers-Salins-Brides-les-Bains station was opened on the line to Bourg-en-Bresse station (reached in 1913). Until 10 September 1926, Moûtiers was a subprefecture of Savoie, when its arrondissement was merged with the arrondissement of Albertville, retaining the former name. The town hall moved to the former subprefecture site shortly thereafter.

Today, the town has a small historic centre with narrow streets surrounding Saint-Pierre Cathedral. It hosted the television display for the 1992 Winter Olympics in Albertville.

== Demographics ==
Historical population
Year	Pop.	±% p.a.
1968	4,161	—
1975	4,187	+0.09%
1982	4,342	+0.52%
1990	4,295	−0.14%
1999	4,151	−0.38%
2007	3,893	−0.80%
2012	3,811	−0.42%
2017	3,501	−1.68%
2023	3,487	−0.07%
Source: INSEE

== Sightseeing ==
- Saint-Pierre Cathedral
