= Ancient Diocese of Tarentaise =

Roman Catholic diocese in France (5 century - 1801)

Coordinates: 45.48°N 6.53°E

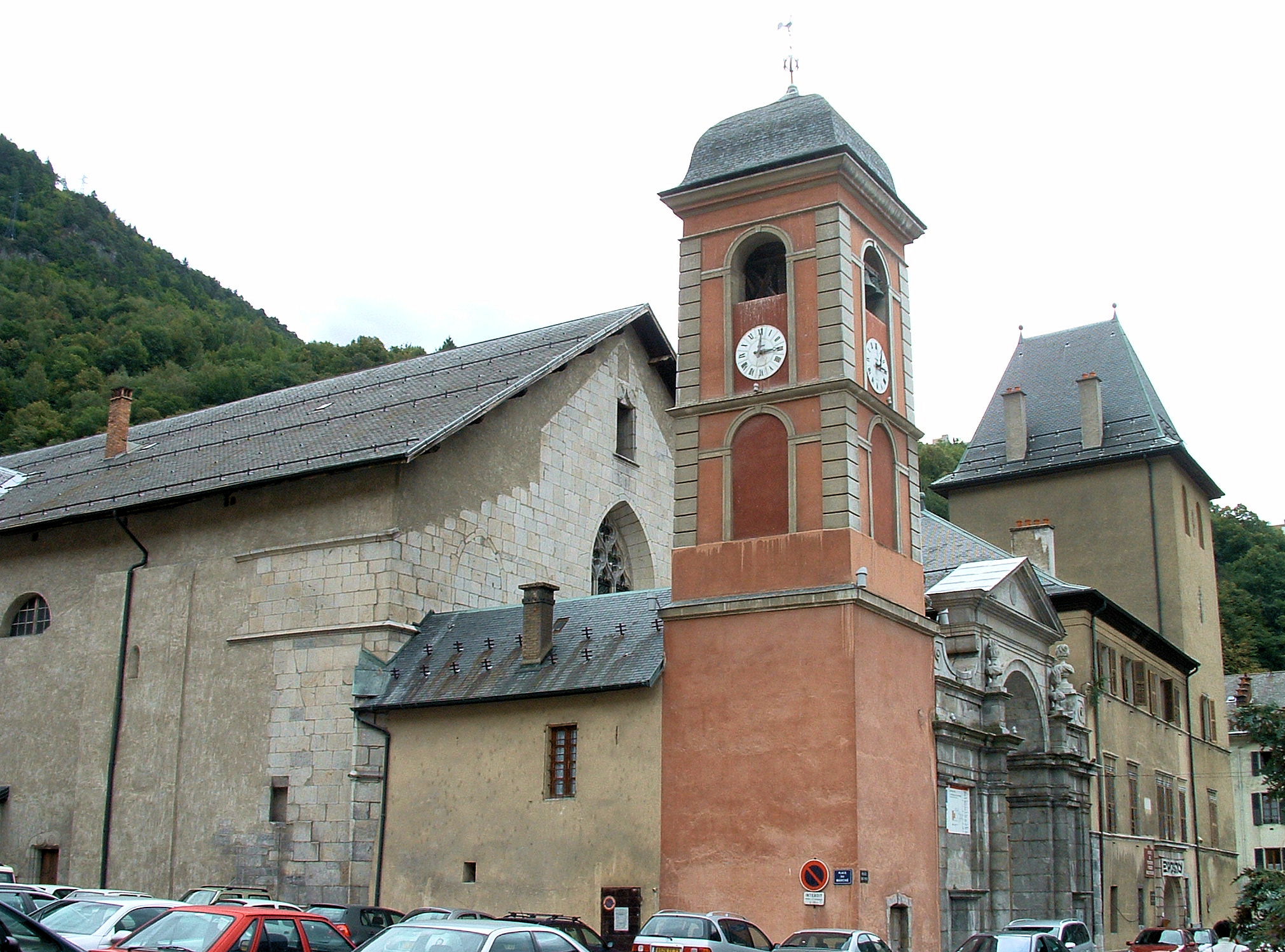
Moûtiers Cathedral, see of the Diocese of Tarentaise.

The Archdiocese of Tarentaise (Latin: Tarantasiensis) was a Roman Catholic diocese and archdiocese in France, with its see in Moûtiers, in the Tarentaise Valley in Savoie. It was established as a diocese in the 5th century, elevated to archdiocese in 794, and disbanded in 1801. The diocese of Tarentaise was again formed in 1825, and united with the diocese of Chambéry and diocese of Saint-Jean-de-Maurienne to form the Archdiocese of Chambéry, Maurienne and Tarentaise in 1966.

== History ==
Legend relates that the Centrones were evangelized in the fifth century by James the Assyrian, secretary to Honoratus, Archbishop of Arles. He became the first Bishop of Darantasia or Tarentaise, the metropolis of the Centrones, and named Marcellus as his successor.

The first document in which the Diocese of Tarentaise is reliably mentioned is a letter of Leo the Great (5 May, 450) which assigns to the Archdiocese of Vienne, among other suffragans, the Bishop of Tarentaise. The first historically known bishop is Sanctius, who in 517 assisted at the Council of Epaon. A plea was brought before the Council of Frankfort (794) against the decision of Leo I that had been confirmed by Popes Symmachus and Gregory the Great. Leo III partly acceded to this plea, and made Darantasia a metropolis with three suffragans, Aosta, Sitten (Sion in French), and Maurienne, but maintained the primacy of Vienne. For four centuries this primacy was the cause of conflicts between the archbishops of Tarentaise and those of Vienne; subsequently Maurienne was again attached to the metropolis of Vienne.

The city of Darantasia was destroyed by the Saracens in the tenth century, whereupon the archbishops moved their residence to the right bank of the Isère, calling it their moutier (monastery), and it was at this place that the town of Moutiers began to be built in the second half of the tenth century.

In the twelfth century the archbishops of Tarentaise were powerful sovereigns. In 1186, a bull of Frederick Barbarossa recognized the Archbishop of Tarentaise as immediate vassal of the empire and prince of the Holy Roman Empire, in disregard of the pretensions of Humbert III, Count of Savoy; but in 1358 a transaction between Archbishop Jean de Bertrand and the Count of Savoy, Amadeus VI, fixed the respective rights of the archbishops and the counts.

Tarentaise belonged to France from 1536 to 1559, and from the sixteenth to the eighteenth century was on four occasions wrested for a time by France from the House of Savoy. In 1792 it formed the Department of Mont Blanc. The Treaty of Paris (30 May 1814) gave it to the King of Sardinia, while the Plebiscite of 22 and 23 April 1860 returned it to France. The Archdiocese of Moutiers in Tarentaise was suppressed in 1792 by the French Revolution. In 1825 a diocese was re-established at Moutiers, suffragan of Chambéry, and was maintained in 1860 in virtue of a special clause in the treaty ceding Savoy to France.

Among the archbishops of Moutiers in Tarentaise may be mentioned:

- Peter I (around 1130) the first Cistercian raised to the episcopate, who founded in a defile the Cistercian Abbey of Tamié, to serve as a shelter for pilgrims and travellers
- the Cistercian monk Peter II (1141–74) founded the charity of the pain de Mai ('May bread'), which until the second half of the eighteenth century distributed bread at Moutiers at the expense of the archdiocese during the first twenty-eight days of May; it was he who upheld Alexander III against Emperor Frederick Barbarossa and the antipope Victor IV, and maintained in obedience to pope Alexander III the seven hundred abbeys of the Cistercian Order. Alexander decided (3 February 1171) that thenceforth the metropolitan See of Tarentaise should depend only on Rome
- Aymon II (1174/6–1211), who in 1186 received the countship of Tarentaise from Frederick Barbarossa and accompanied the emperor on the Third Crusade in 1189
- Peter III (1271–83)
- Cardinal Antoine de Chalant (1402–18), to whom has been ascribed "Le livre du Roi Modus et de la reine Ratio", a much-esteemed treatise on hunting
- Cardinal Jean d'Arces (1438–54), who at the Council of Basle in 1440 supported Duke Amadeus of Savoy, antipope under the name of Felix V, against pope Eugene IV
- Cardinals Christopher and Dominic de la Rovére (1472–78 and 1478–83), whose tomb erected at Rome in the Church of Santa Maria del Popolo is a splendid monument of the Renaissance
- Germonio (1607–27), who played an important part in the seventeenth-century reform of the clergy and whose "Commentaries" and "Acta Ecclesiæ Tarentasiensis" are important documents for the history of the time

As natives of the diocese may be mentioned: Pope Nicholas II (1059), born at Chevron-Villette of the family of the lords of Miolans; Pierre d'Aigueblanche, who in 1240 became Archbishop of Hereford in England, and for twenty-five years was councillor and minister to Henry III of England; Blessed Peter of Tarentaise, who became pope in 1276 under the name of Innocent V.

The chief pilgrimages of the diocese are: Notre Dame de Briançon, which dates from the victory over the Saracens in the tenth century; kings Francis I of France and Henry IV of France visited this shrine; Notre Dame des Vernettes, at Peisey, created in the eighteenth century near a miraculous fountain; Notre Dame de la Vie at St. Martin de Belleville; Notre Dame de Beaufort; St. Anne at Villette dating from 1248.

== See also ==
- Roman Catholic Archdiocese of Chambéry–Saint-Jean-de-Maurienne–Tarentaise
- Catholic Church in France
- List of Catholic dioceses in France

== Bibliography ==
=== Sources ===
- Gams, Pius Bonifatius (1873). Series episcoporum Ecclesiae catholicae: quotquot innotuerunt a beato Petro apostolo. Ratisbon: Typis et Sumptibus Georgii Josephi Manz. pp. 548–549. (Use with caution; obsolete)
- Eubel, Conradus, ed. (1913). Hierarchia catholica, Tomus 1 (second ed.). Münster: Libreria Regensbergiana. p. 301. (in Latin)
- Eubel, Conradus, ed. (1914). Hierarchia catholica, Tomus 2 (second ed.). Münster: Libreria Regensbergiana. p. 175.
- Eubel, Conradus, ed. (1923). Hierarchia catholica, Tomus 3 (second ed.). Münster: Libreria Regensbergiana.
- Gauchat, Patritius (Patrice) (1935). Hierarchia catholica IV (1592-1667). Münster: Libraria Regensbergiana. p. 219.
- Ritzler, Remigius; Sefrin, Pirminus (1952). Hierarchia catholica medii et recentis aevi V (1667-1730). Patavii: Messagero di S. Antonio.

=== Studies ===
- Jean, Armand (1891). Les évêques et les archevêques de France depuis 1682 jusqu'à 1801 (in French). Paris: A. Picard.
- Pisani, Paul (1907). Répertoire biographique de l'épiscopat constitutionnel (1791-1802) (in French). Paris: A. Picard et fils.
