= Ayrald =

Beatified roman catholic bishop

Ayrald (also Airald or Ayraldus) was a French Carthusian monk and bishop of Saint-Jean-de-Maurienne. He died between 1161 and 1162. He was canonized by Pope Pius IX on January 8, 1863.

Ayrald was the son of William II of Burgundy. He was the prior of the Carthusian charterhouse at Portes, diocese of Belley, France. He later became the bishop of Saint-Jean-de-Maurienne from 1132 to 1156.

Ayrald was beatified by Pope Pius IX on January 8, 1863. According to nominis.cef.fr his feast day is on January 2. Until the 1960s, the Saint-Jean-de-Maurienne Cathedral had a chapel dedicated to Ayrald.
