= Walchunus =

Bishop of Maurienne, France, circa 739

Walchunus was a bishop, presumably of the Diocese of Maurienne, circa 739. When Abbo, the saecular rector of the region of Maurienne and Susa and later Patrician of Provence, founded the Abbey of Novalesa on 30 January 726, he put it under the Benedictine rule and independent of the local bishop, that of Maurienne. When he drew up his will thirteen years later (739) he directed that Novalesa should come under the protection of Bishop Walchunus. This action did not place Novalesa under episcopal authority; it merely recognised the saecular stature of the bishop in the region. The role of protector of the monastery passed in the later years of the century to the ruling Carolingians, who also confirmed its independence of the bishop.
