= Louis de La Palud =

French Roman Catholic bishop and cardinal

His Eminence Louis de La Palud
- Cardinal-Priest
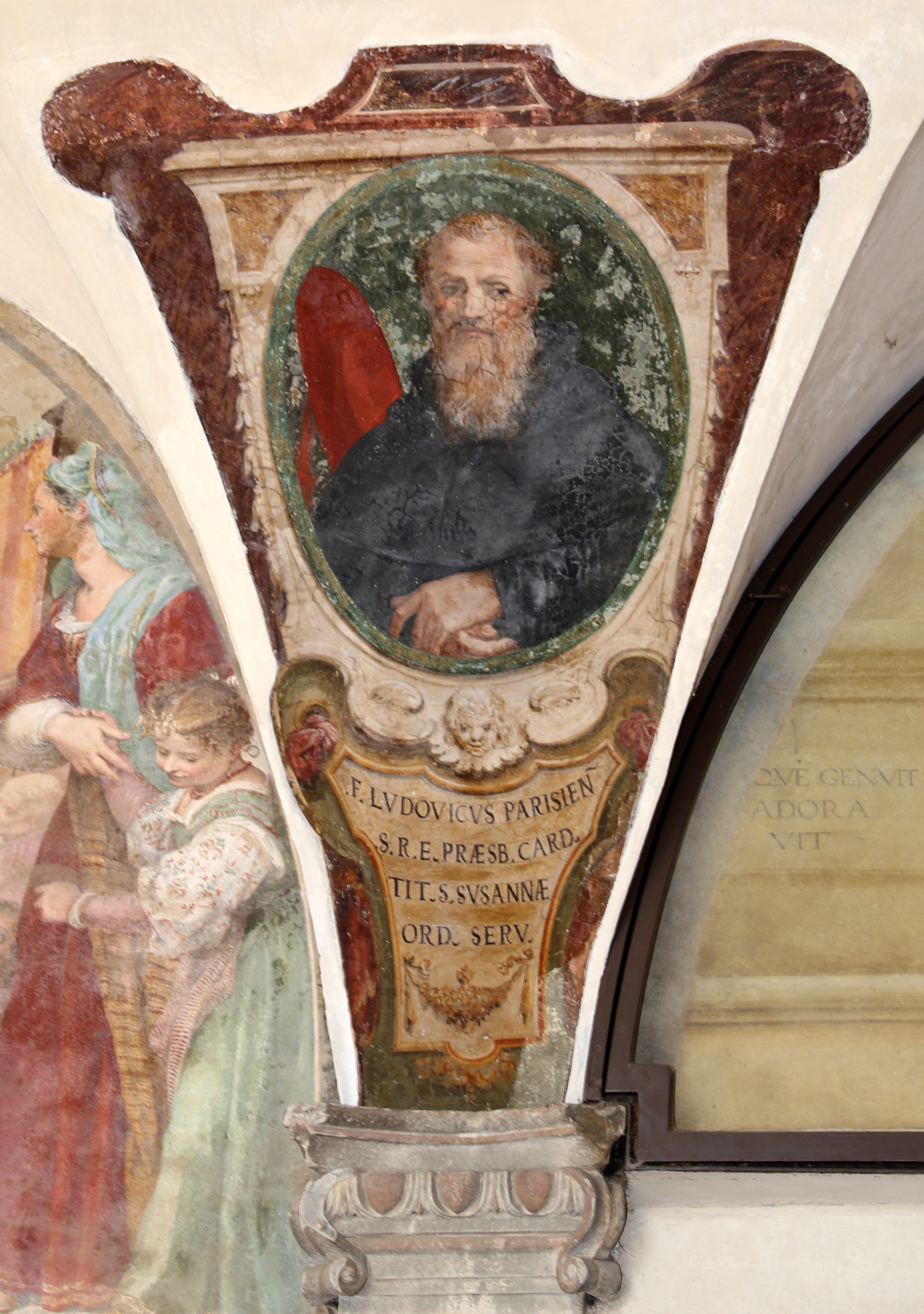
- Church: Santa Susanna, Rome (1440–1449); Sant'Anastasia al Palatino (1449–1451)
- Diocese: Lausanne (1431–1433–1449); Maurienne (1449–1451)

Orders
- Created cardinal: 12 April 1440 (Obedience of Basel); 19 December 1449 (Roman Obedience) by Antipope Felix V by Pope Nicholas V
- Rank: Cardinal Priest

Personal details
- Born: c. 1370 Châtillon-la-Palud (Bresse)
- Died: 21 September 1451 Rome
- Buried: Varambon (France)
- Residence: Tournus, Basel, Rome, Maurienne
- Parents: Aymé de La Palud, seigneur of Varambon; Alix de Corgenon
- Occupation: diplomat, administrator
- Profession: abbot, bishop
- Education: University of Paris

Louis de La Palud (c. 1375 – 1451), called the Cardinal of Varambon or the Cardinal of Maurienne, was a French Roman Catholic bishop and cardinal.

== Biography ==
Louis de La Palud was born in Châtillon-la-Palud (Bresse), sometime between 1370 and 1380. He was the son of Aymé de La Palud, seigneur of Varambon, and Alix de Corgenon, who was the cousin of Abbot Aimé de Corgenon of Tournus.

He entered the Order of Saint Benedict in Tournus c. 1382. He studied at the Collège de Sorbonne, receiving a doctorate. He was ordained as a priest. He served as a chamberlain of the abbey of Our Lady of Ambronay for four years and then abbot for six years; during his term, he obtained privileges for the monastery from Pope Benedict XIII in 1404. He was still abbot of Ambronay on 6 April 1410, when he participated in the transfer of the remains of the Martyrs of Lyon. He was elected abbot of Tournus in 1413; his successor took office on 2 December 1431.

=== Council of Constance ===
The abbot of Tournus participated in the Council of Constance (1414–18). During the council, in February 1417, a Chapter of the Benedictine Order in Germany was ordered, and Abbot Louis de La Palud was elected one of the presidents of the Chapter. At the papal conclave in November 1417, he served as one of the Custodes ciborum (keepers of the foodstuffs). During his absence at the council, the abbey of Tournus was despoiled of several priories and benefices to the benefit of the bishop of Chalons. Abbot Louis obtained a bull from Pope Martin V on 23 December 1417, voiding all the transactions and restoring the property to the abbey of Tournus. He followed the papal court to Geneva (May to December 1418), and sent his monastery various gifts in June, even visiting them for a few days in September. He returned to the monastery finally on 6 December 1418.

He later served as a deputy of the Gallic nation at the Council of Siena (1423–1424), and then as bishop of Lausanne attended the Council of Basel (1431–38).

Abbot Louis de La Palud established the first chaplain in the chapel, Nôtre-Dame de Consolation, which he had founded and had constructed, on 19 June 1428. The chapel was pillaged by the Huguenots in 1562, and razed in 1722. On 6 July 1428, Abbot Louis appointed two vicars-general for the abbey of Tournus, intending to depart for Rome. He remained in Rome until his appointment to the bishopric of Lausanne in June 1431.

=== Bishop ===
La Palud was appointed (provided) bishop of Lausanne by Pope Eugenius IV on 6 June 1431, and in a letter of 8 June 1431 he reminded the Chapter of Lausanne that his papal predecessors had reserved the right to appoint the bishops of Lausanne. The Chapter was not pleased at being deprived of their traditional electoral rights. Had they been allowed an election, the majority of the canons (most of whom were adherents of the dukes of Savoy) would have chosen Jean de Prangins, who held a licenciate in law and held the dignity of Cantor in the cathedral of Lausanne; he had also been vicar-general of Bishop Guillaume de Challant. They therefore consulted with Amadeus VIII, Duke of Savoy, and on 20 August 1431, an appeal was lodged in the Council of Basel by Philibert de Rupe, the duke's procurator at the papal curia. The duke and the Chapter also asked Pope Eugene IV to reconsider and appoint their candidate. On 4 November 1432, the pope agreed, and transferred Louis de La Palud to Avignon and appointed Jean de Prangins bishop of Lausanne, which brought on a conflict between the new bishop and Louis de La Palud, who had the support of the Council of Basel.

=== Louis de la Palud at the Council of Basel ===
In January 1432, Louis de La Pelud joined the Council of Basel.

On 12 November 1432, Pope Eugenius IV sent a letter to Cardinal Giuliano Cesarini, the president of the council, authorizing him to dissolve the Council of Basel. Cesarini did not do so, which enraged Bishop Daniel de Rampi, Papal Treasurer and Vicar of Rome, who was carrying bulls and papal instructions. Cesarini wrote a long letter of explanation and appeal to the pope, asking him to reconsider his position, and in January 1432 sent it to Rome with two delegates, Louis de La Palud and Henri, Dean of Utrecht. In the meantime, on 18 December 1421, Pope Eugenius transferred the council from Basel to Bologna. La Palud and his associate were successful in persuading Pope Eugene to support the council, but Louis' siding with the council brought a cooling in the relationship with the pope.

On 4 November 1433, Bishop Marco Condulmer was transferred from the bishopric of Avignon to the archdiocese of Tarentaise. At the same time, Pope Eugene transferred Bishop Louis de La Palud to the diocese of Avignon. La Palud attempted to refuse the transfer, and the pope had to appoint an administrator of the diocese of Avignon, Bartolus Angeli de Cingulo. Pope Eugene, moreover, had appointed as the new bishop of Lausanne the Cantor of the cathedral Chapter, Jean de Prangins, on 4 November 1433. On the same day, the pope wrote to the duke, noting that the see of Lausanne was without a bishop (pastoris regiminis destitutae), and that he had provided Jean de Prangis; he requested the duke to give the bishop-elect his support. De Prangis was installed and took his oath on 2 March 1434.

On 7 November 1434, DUke Amadeus VIII of Savoie announced his decision to retire to a monastery which he had built, and to leave the direction of the affairs of Savoie to his elder son Louis, the Captain-General. Bishop Jean de Prangins of Lausanne was one of the dignitaries present at the ceremony.

In June 1435, the Council of Basel sent an embassy including Louis de La Palud of Lausanne, Bishop Louis de Amaral of Viseu, and Bishop Delphinus Angeli of Parma, to Greece to attempt a reconciliation with the Eastern Orthodox Church. On 13 April 1436, the council had read a bull sent by its ambassadors, and signed by the Emperor and Patriarch in Constantinople, concerning the union of the churches.

Pope Eugenius IV was deposed by the Council of Basel on 25 June 1439.

After he returned to Basel, on 21 August 1439 Louis de La Palud presented his accounts for the Greek embassy to the council, and on 26 February 1439, he was named major poenitentiarius by the council.

=== In the Obedience of Felix V ===
Bishop Louis de La Palud was named substitute chamberlain (locumtenens camerarii) for the duration of the conclave, which was about to begin, to replace the deposed Eugenius IV. He was elected president of the council on 1 November 1439, in place of Cardinal Louis Aleman, the archbishop of Arles, for the duration of the conclave.

He adhered to the party of Antipope Felix V, who had been elected on 5 November 1439.

On 12 April 1440, at Thonon-les-Bains, Pope Felix V (of the Obedience of the Council of Basel) appointed La Palud a cardinal of his Obedience, assigning him the titular church of Santa Susanna in Rome. He was granted the diocese of Saint-Jean-de-Maurienne, in July (?) 1441, and occupied that see until his death. Pope Felix V wrote him a letter in 1447, about reconstruction of the cathedral and the digging of flood channels after the great flood on 1439. In 1445, he became prior in commendam of Aiton.

Pope Felix V abdicated his position on 7 April 1449, and was appointed cardinal and suburbicarian bishop of Sabina. Le Palud was in Lausanne on 19 June 1449, when he signed his last will and testament.

=== Return to the Roman Obedience ===
Cardinal de La Palud later submitted to Pope Nicholas V, who made him a cardinal priest in the consistory of 19 December 1449; he received the titular church of Sant'Anastasia al Palatino on 12 January 1450. He entered Rome on 11 December 1450, and was received in consistory at the Vatican palace by Pope Nicholas and the cardinals, on 12 December 1450. In Rome, on 4 June 1451, he obtained from Pope Nicholas a bull erecting a Chapter in the collegiate church of Varembon.

Cardinal de Varembon died in Rome, according to some authorities, on 21 September 1451. He is buried in St. Peter's Basilica. Others indicate that he died in Maurienne, and was buried in the marble tomb which he had constructed for himself. Schmitt states that he died in his chateau of Chamoux en Maurienne, and was buried in his marble tomb, which was in the church of Varembon. Pierre Juenin states that De La Palud died in Rome, and his remains were transported to Varembon.

The inscription on his tomb reads, "Hic jacet reverendissimus in Christo pater dominus Ludovicus tituli S. Anastasiae sanctae Romanae ecclesiae presbyter cardinalis de Varembone vulgariter nuncupatus, qui obiit die ... mensis Septembris MCCCLI."

== Bibliography ==
- Creighton, Mandell (1892). A History of the Papacy, Vol. II: The Council of Basel: The Papal restoration, 1418–1464. London: Longmans, Green, and Company, 1892.
- Eubel, Conradus, ed. (1914). Hierarchia catholica (in Latin). Vol. 2 (Tomus II) (second ed.). Münster: Libreria Regensbergiana. archived
- Hofmann, Georgius (ed.) (1940). Concilium Florentinum: Documenta et Scriptores: Epistolae Pontificiae Spectantes. Pars I: Epistolae Pontificiae De Rebus Ante Concilium Florentinum Gestis (1418–1438). (in Latin). Romae: Pontificium Institutum Orientalium Studiorum, 1940.
- John of Segovia, "Historia gestorum generalis synodi Basiliensis." In: Palacký, František; von Birk, Ernst; Stehlin, Karl; Hieronimus, Konrad Wilhelm (edd.). Monumenta conciliorum generalium seculi decimi quinti: Concilium Basileense: scriptorum tomus primus. (in Latin). Volume 2. Vienna: Typis C.R. Officinae typographicae aulae et status, 1873. [John of Segovia, Books I-XII]
- Reymond, Maxime (1912). Les dignitaires de l'église Nôtre-Dame de Lausanne jusqu'en 1536, (in French). [Mémoires et documents / Société d'histoire de la Suisse romande Volume 8]. Lausanne: G. Bridel & cie, 1912.
- Schmitt, Martin (1858). Mémoires historiques sur le Diocèse de Lausanne. (in French). Fribourg: Impr. J.-L. Piller, 1858. Volume 2.
- Schweizer, Jules (1929). Le cardinal Louis de la Palud et son procès pour la possession du siège épiscopal de Lausanne. (in French). Paris: Librairie Felix Alcan, 1929.
