= Saint-Jean-de-Maurienne Cathedral =

Church in Saint-Jean-de-Maurienne, Savoie, France

Coordinates: 45.2729°N 6.3484°E

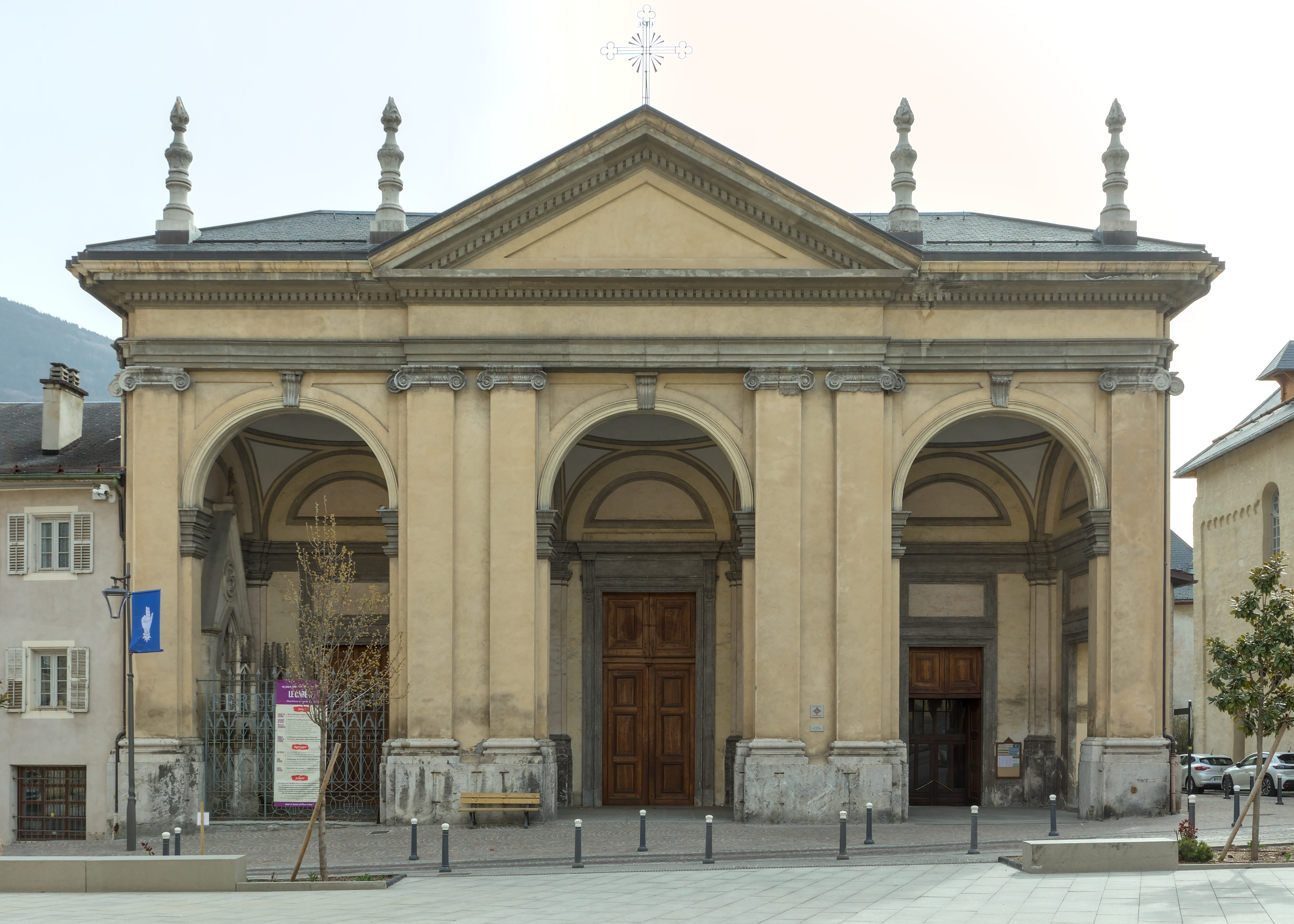
The facade.

Saint-Jean-de-Maurienne Cathedral is a church in Saint-Jean-de-Maurienne, Savoie, that is one of two co-cathedrals of the Roman Catholic Archdiocese of Chambéry–Saint-Jean-de-Maurienne–Tarentaise. Until 1966, it was the cathedral of the Diocese of Saint-Jean-de-Maurienne. It is dedicated to John the Baptist.

It was built in the 6th century and rebuilt in the 11th. In 1771, a neoclassical porch was added. It holds the remains of the first three counts of the House of Savoy: Humbert I, Amadeus I and Boniface.

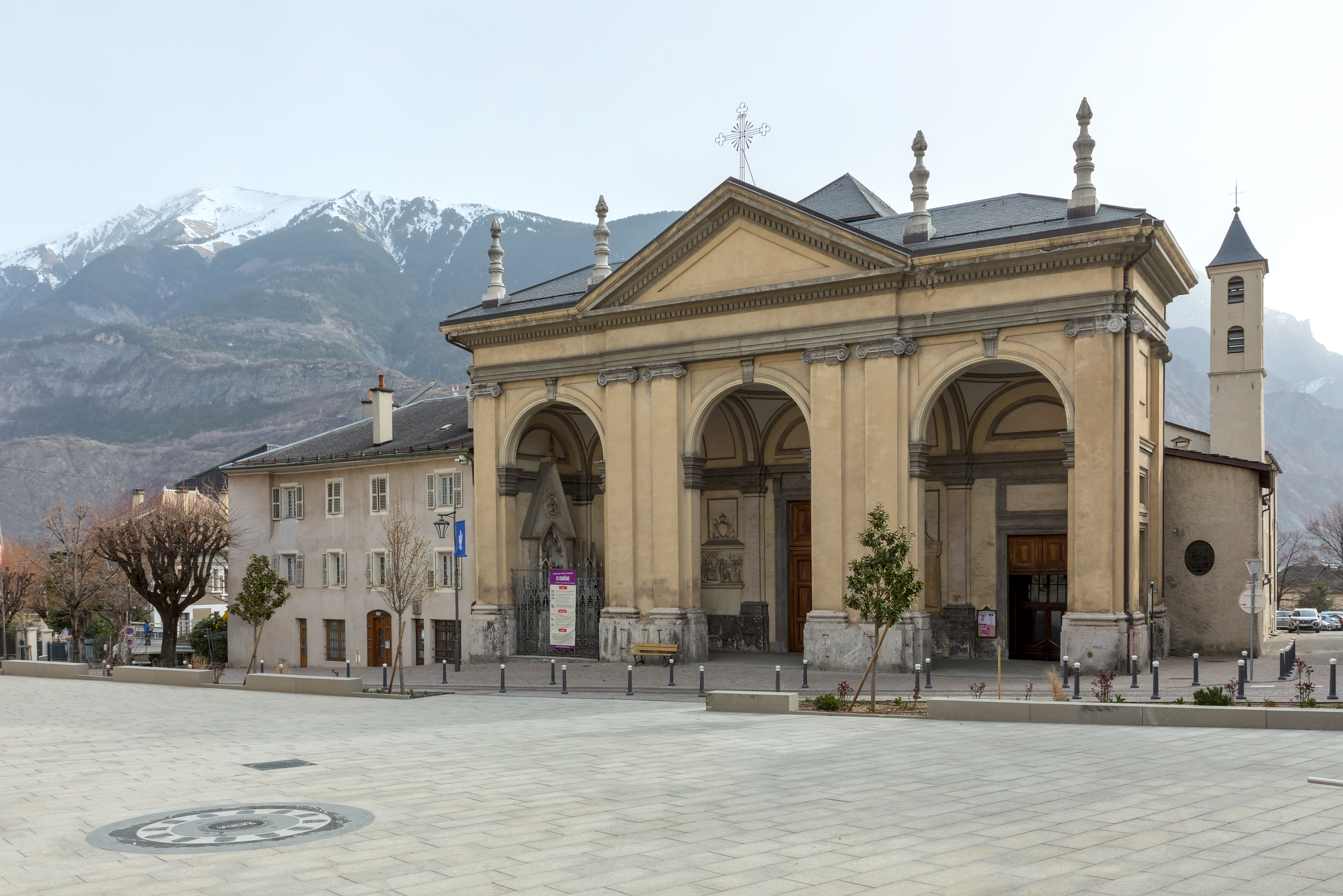
Facade, with the Alps in the background.

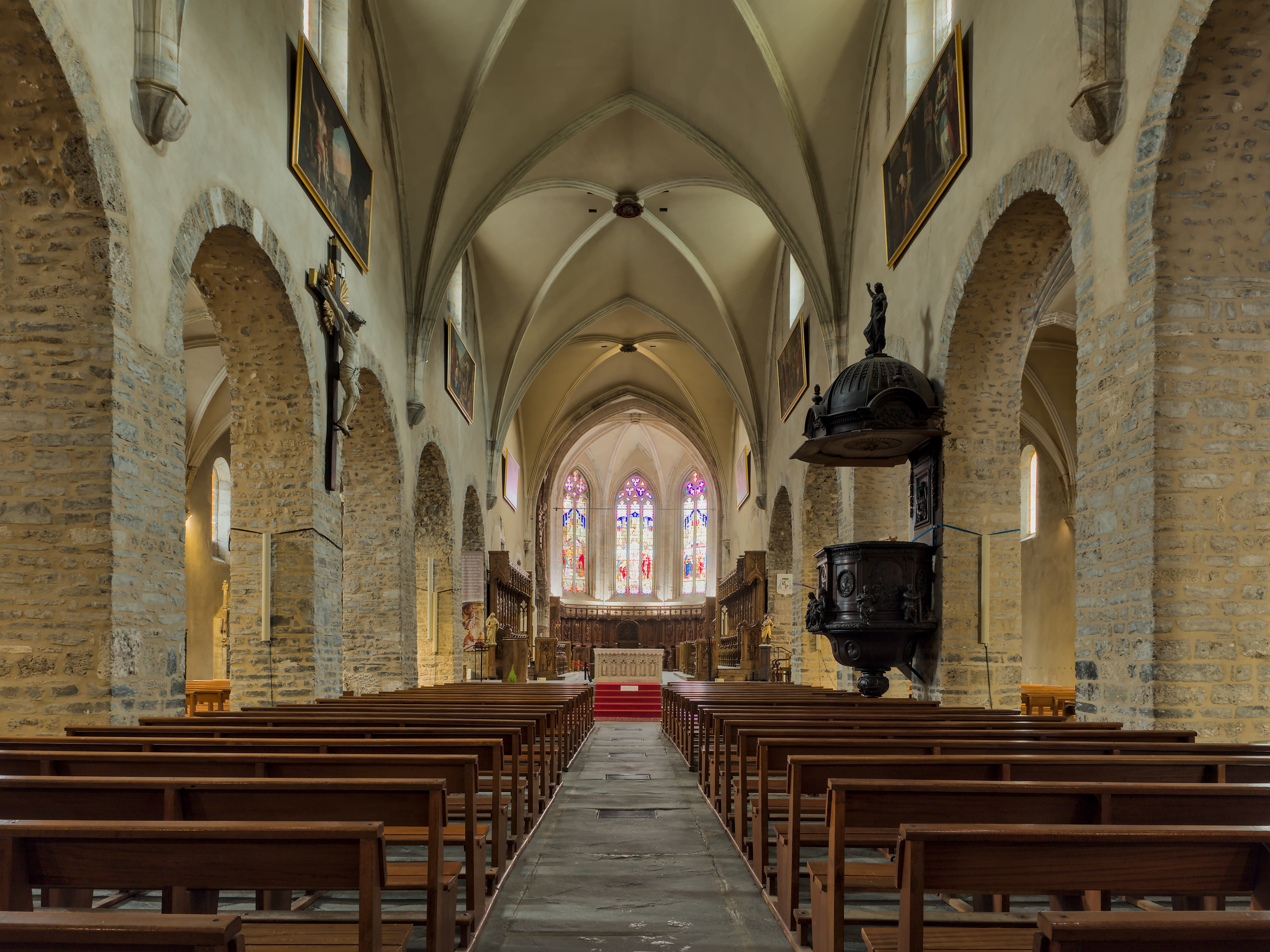
The nave.

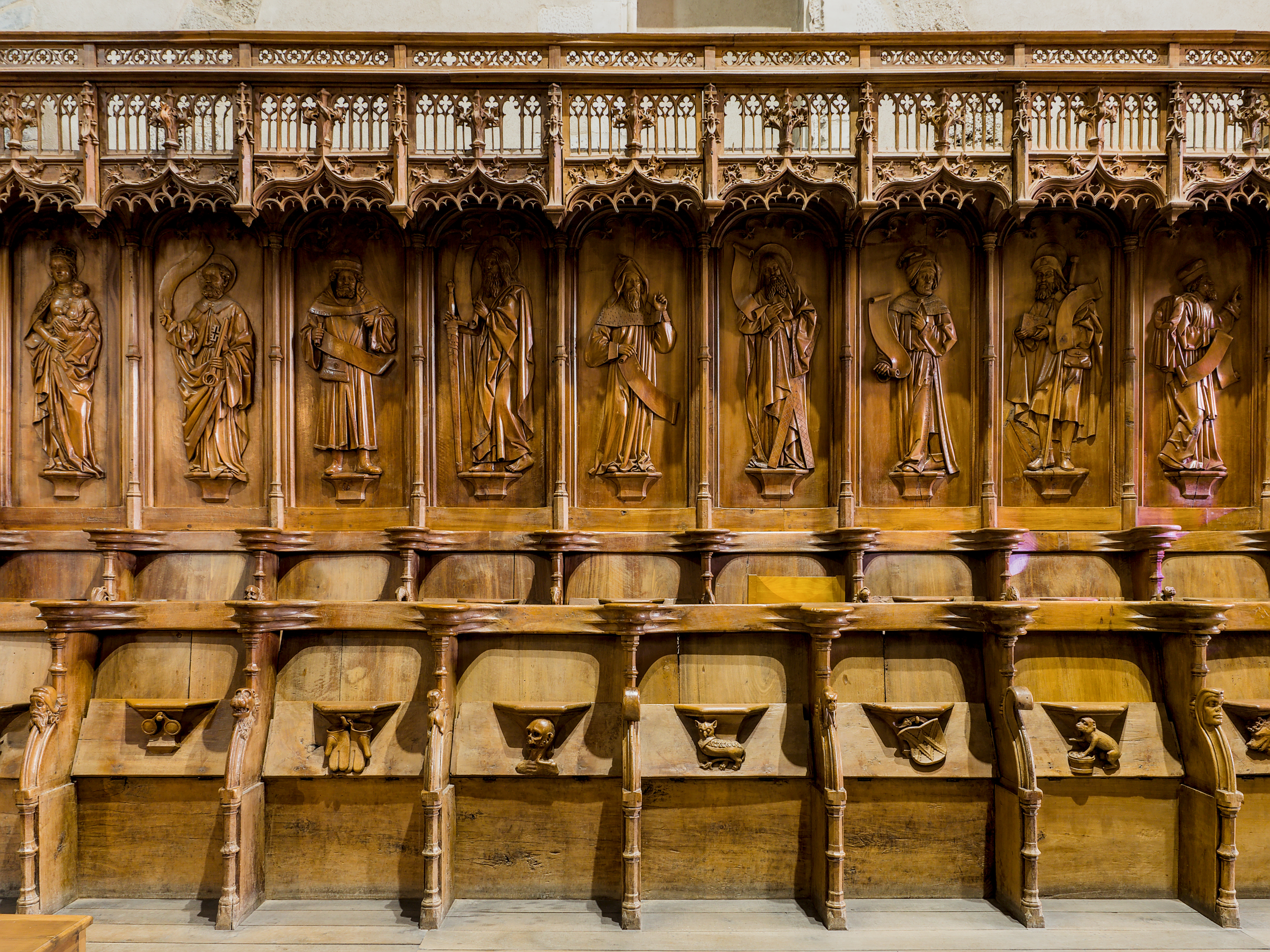
Part of the choir stalls.

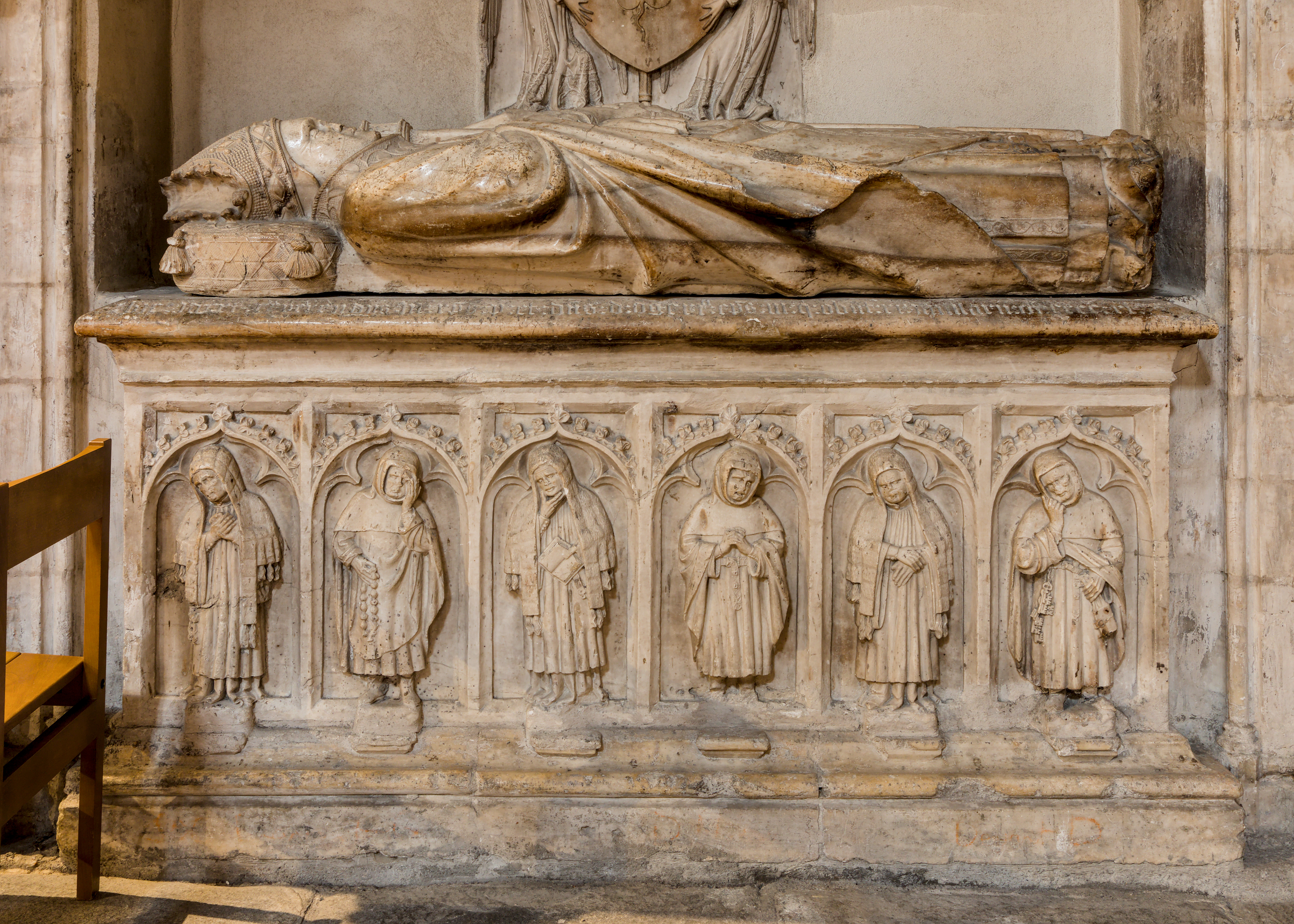
Funerary monument of Oger de Conflans.

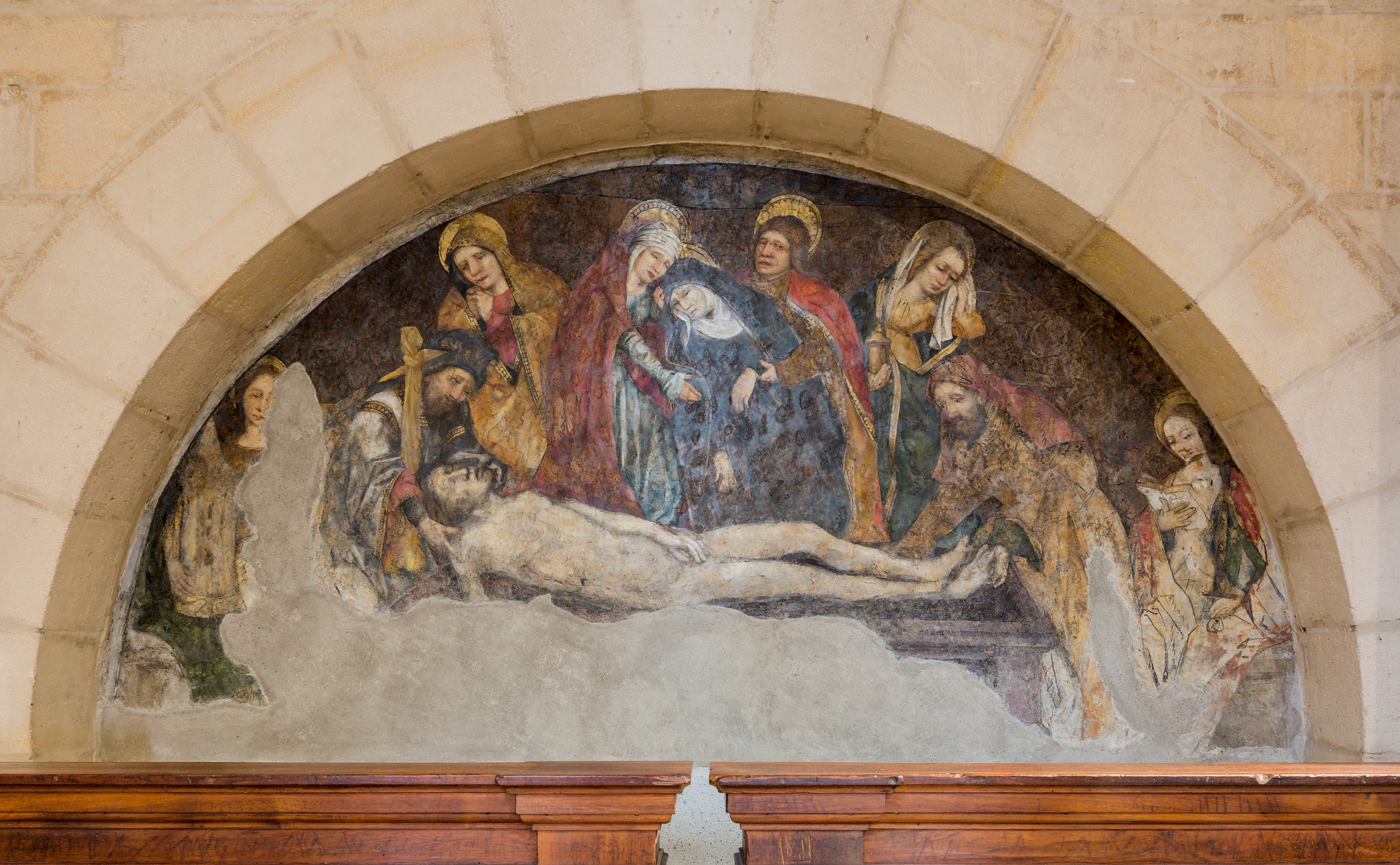
Fresco of the Entombment (15th century).

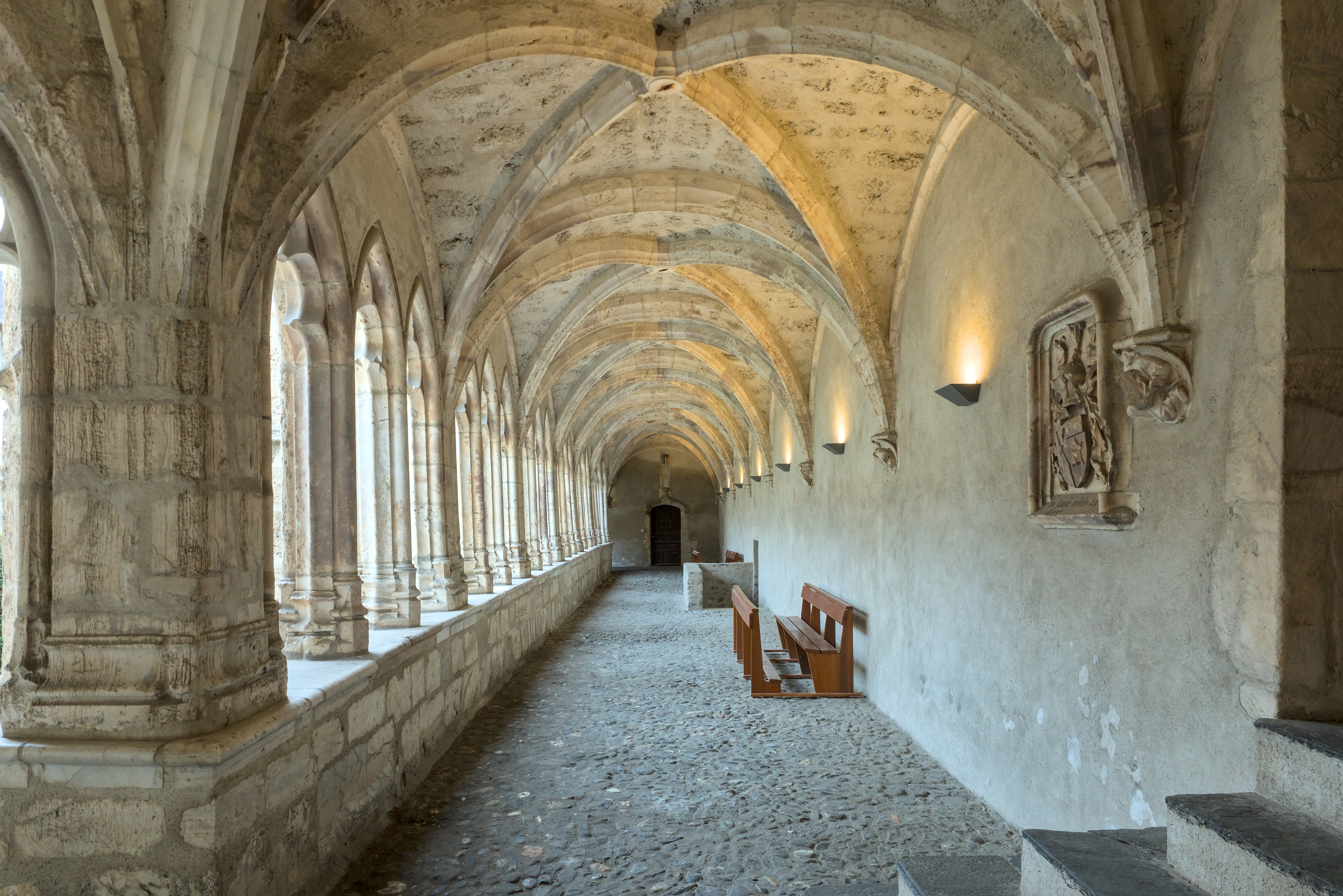
The cloister.
