= Diocese of Saint-Jean-de-Maurienne =

French Roman Catholic diocese

Coordinates: 45.2729°N 6.3484°E

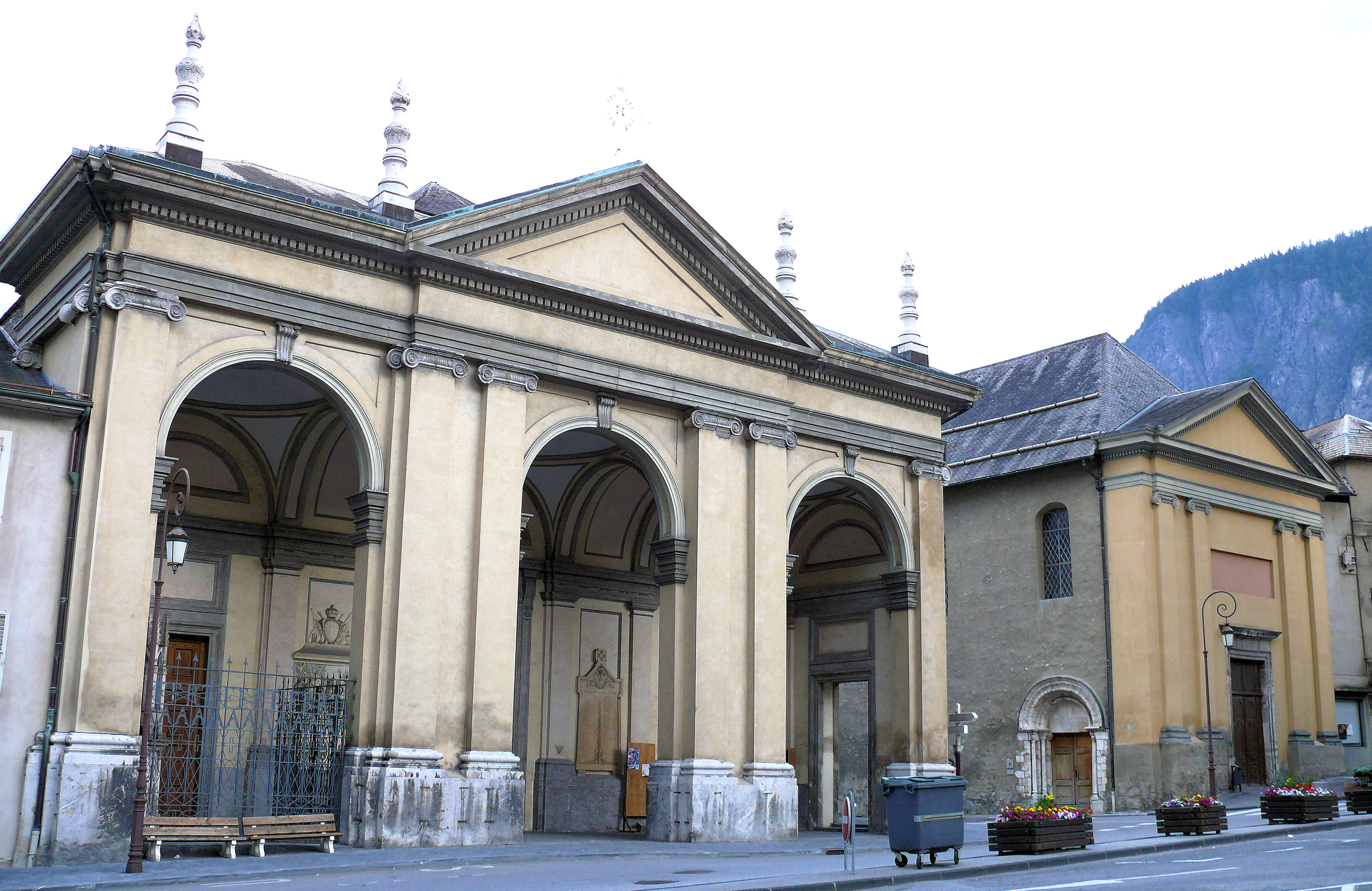
Cathedral in Saint-Jean-de-Maurienne

The French Roman Catholic diocese of Saint-Jean-de-Maurienne (San Giovanni di Moriana in Italian) has since 1966 been effectively suppressed, formally united with the archdiocese of Chambéry. While it has not been suppressed, and is supposed to be on a par with Chambéry and the diocese of Tarentaise, it no longer has a separate bishop or existence.

== History ==
Gregory of Tours's De Gloria Martyrum relates how the church of Maurienne, belonging then to the Diocese of Turin, became a place of pilgrimage, after the holy woman Thigris or Thecla, a native of Valloires, had brought to it as sacred relic from the East a finger of John the Baptist, the same figure which touched Jesus Christ during his baptism. Jacob of Voragine, who is using the work of Gregory, says that the finger of John the Baptist suddenly appeared on the altar of the church at Maurienne, after a Gallic matron earnestly prayed God to give her a relic of the Baptist. Bishop Étienne de Morel (1483–1499) procured for the cathedral a finger of the right hand of Saint Peter. Guntram, King of Burgundy, took from the Lombards in 574 the valleys of Maurienne and Suse, and in 576 founded near the shrine a bishopric, detached from the then Diocese of Turin (in Piedmont, northern Italy), as suffragan of the Archdiocese of Vienne, also comprising the Briançonnais.

Its first bishop was Felmasius, known from a document on the Baptist relic's first miracle. In 599, Gregory the Great failed to make the Merovingian Queen Brunehaut oblige the protests of the Bishop of Turin against this foundation.

Leo III (795-816) made Darantasia (Tarantaise, Loire) a Metropolitan archbishopric with three suffragans, Aosta, Sitten, and Maurienne, but maintained the Ancient primatial status of Vienne.

A letter written by John VIII in 878 acknowledged the claim of Archbishop Teutrannus of Tarantaise that the Bishop of Maurienne was suffragan of Tarentaise, but ordered the archbishop to settle his claim with the Archbishop of Vienne. For four centuries this supremacy was the cause of conflicts between the archbishops of Tarentaise and the Metropolitans of Vienne, who continued to claim Maurienne as a suffragan see.

In 904 or 908, Pope Sergius III purportedly wrote to Archbishop Alexander of Vienne, according to Cardinal Billiet, confirming that the diocese of Maurienne was a suffragan of the archbishop of Vienne. The document, however, is one of the notorious "Vienne Forgeries."

In an apostolic brief of 26 April 1123, addressed to Bishop Amedeus, Pope Callistus II affirmed that Maurienne was a suffragan of the metropolis of Vienne, as it had been when he himself was archbishop of Vienne (1088–1119); he also ruled that the city of Susa belonged to the diocese of Maurienne.

As its first see, a cathedral of John the Baptist was built in the 6th century, destroyed by invading Saracens in 943 and rebuilt in the 11th century.

S. Jean-de-Maurienne was twice sacked by the Saracens, in 732 and 906. After the Saracens had been driven out, the temporal sovereignty of the Bishop of Maurienne appears to have been very extensive. By the beginning of the 11th century, according to Cardinal Billiet, the bishop was temporal ruler of 19 parishes on the left bank of the River Arc, the parish of S. Jean at Valmeinier, and two or three on the right bank. But there is no proof that such sovereignty had been recognized since Gontran's time.

=== Imperial and royal influence ===
At the death in 1032 of Rudolph III of Burgundy, the last ruler of the independent Kingdom of Burgundy, Bishop Thibaut was powerful enough to join a league against Holy Roman Emperor Conrad II of Franconia. In 1033 the city of Maurienne was destroyed by imperial troops. The bishopric lost part of its territory (the Susa valley) to the diocese of Turin, which was promised all.

In 1038, it is claimed, the Emperor Conrad suppressed the see of Maurienne altogether, giving over its title and possessions to the Bishops of Turin. This imperial decree was never executed though, due probably to the death of Conrad on 4 June 1039. At the death of Bishop Guido of Turin in 1044, it is stated, Bishop Thibaud was fully reinstated at Maurienne. The imperial diploma concerning the handing over of Maurienne to Turin, however, has been shown to be a forgery, and thus the entire story is called into question.

==== Maurienne in the 15th century ====
Arvan In February 1440, a major flood from the Bonrieu river to the west, overran the entire city of Maurienne. In a 1447 report of Canon Hugo de Fabrica, the vicar-general, to Bishop Louis de La Palud, the Cardinal de Varambone, a great part of the houses of the city as well as the cathedral were ruined. The cathedral was so badly damaged that the upper church had to be completely rebuilt, and the lower church was filled with debris and unusable. A bridge over the flooding Arvan river was washed away, as well as another bridge over the Arc river, which was also in flood.

During much of the fifteenth century, the administration of the diocese was neglected. Saturnin Truchet notes that from 1441 to 1483 the bishops were non-residential, with the exception of the last five years of the life of Cardinal Louis de La Palud (1441–1451), the Cardinal de Varambon. The decima tax of the bishops was frequently not paid or was irregularly collected, due to the inattention and lack of supervision of the collectors. Cardinal Guillaume d'Estouteville (1453–1483) was particularly remiss.

The next bishop, Étienne de Morel (1483–1499) was also an absent pastor. He was papal datary of Pope Sixtus IV when he was appointed to the diocese of Maurienne on 31 January 1483. He was still in Rome, and still functioning as datary at the pope's death on 12 August 1484; he was an official custodian at the main gate of the conclave that followed. He participated in the papal consistory of 20 December 1484 on the subject of the canonization of Duke Leopold of Austria. On 11 February 1485, he was present at the papal consistory in which Pope Innocent VIII received Cardinal Jean Balue on his return from his embassy to the French court; Bishop Morel had the honor of reading aloud in French the letter from King Charles VIII to the pope. Morel was a Referendary of Pope Innocent VIII, who, on 17 November 1487, ratified an agreement between the bishop and the commune of Maurienne with regard to the wine decima.

On 2 March 1506, Bishop Louis de Gorrevod de Challand (1499–1532) issued a set of Constitutions for the diocese of Maurienne. They were particularly concerned with taxation and the regulation of tax officials.

In 1512, Bishop Louis de Gorrevod ordered the publication of an official liturgical book for the diocese of Maurienne, the Breviarium ad usum Maurianensis ecclesiae, based on that used by the cathedral Chapter. During his administration two collegiate churches were founded, Ste. Anne de Chamoux and S. Marcel de la Chambre. The house of the Celestines at Villard-Sallet and the convent of the Carmelites of la Rochette were also founded.

==== The diocese of Bourg-en-Bresse and Francis I ====
As early as 1451, the dukes of Savoy had been interested in raising the profile of their ecclesiastical establishment. Louis, Duke of Savoy, sent an embassy to Pope Nicholas V, indicating his wish that Turin be made a metropolitan archdiocese, and that new dioceses be created at Bourg en Bresse and Chambéry. In July 1515, at the urging of Charles III, Duke of Savoy, and over the objections of Francis I of France, the archbishop of Vienne, and the bishop of Grenoble, Pope Leo X established a new diocese, Bourg in Bresse, out of territory belonging to the diocese of Maurienne, and a new diocese at Chambéry. The church of S. Maria de Burgo in Bressia was elevated to the status of a cathedral. The first bishop of Bourg was Bishop Louis de Gorrevod of Maurienne, who was allowed to hold both dioceses at the same time. He was also assigned an auxiliary bishop, Jean de Joly, O.P., titular bishop of Hebron, in 1524; in 1544 the auxiliary bishop was Pierre Meynard, also titular bishop of Hebron. In November 1515, Bishop de Gorrevod convened a synod of all the ecclesiastics in the new diocese of Bourg, and drew up a set of statutes, which were published in 1516. Gorrevod was named a cardinal by Pope Clement VII on 9 March 1530, and on the same day his nephew, Jean Philibert de Challant, was appointed bishop of Bourg-en-Bresse.

In 1531, Cardinal de Gorrevod was appointed papal legate in all the territories possessed by the dukes of Savoy, and his powers were confirmed on 2 April 1531 by a letter of Duke Charles III . He resigned the diocese of Maurienne on 10 April 1532, in favor of his nephew, Jean Philibert de Challant, thereby once again bringing the two dioceses together under the leadership of one bishop. Challant was only bishop-elect of Bresse, however, since he did not receive episcopal consecration until 22 May 1541.

In the struggle between France (King Francis I) and Spain (Emperor Charles V) over the duchy of Milan, the duke of Savoy found himself drawn, especially after the defeat and capture of Francis at the Battle of Pavia in 1525, into the orbit of Charles V. By 1535, Francis I believed himself strong enough to confront Charles III of Savoy. He confronted Charles and the exiled bishop of Geneva who were besieging Protestant Geneva, raising the siege, capturing the Vaud, and expelling the bishop of Lausanne. On 11 February 1536, the king gave the order to invade Bugey and Bresse, and on 24 February his troops entered Savoy. He immediately ordered the suppression of the diocese of Bourg-en-Bresse, whose establishment he had protested, and also refused the bishop-elect of Chambéry, Urbain de Miolans, to take possession of his diocese.

==== Maurienne in the 16th century ====
When Bishop de Challant died in 1544, the cathedral Chapter of Maurienne, in accordance with tradition, assembled on 20 July 1544 to elect a new bishop. They chose François de Luxembourg, vicomte de Martigues, who was not in holy orders. Their choice was rejected by King Francis, and he himself attempted to install Dominique de Saint-Séverin as bishop of Maurienne. The Chapter, however, rejected Saint-Severin, and therefore the diocese depended on an auxiliary bishop for several years. Pope Paul III transferred bishop-elect Girolamo Recanati Capodiferro from Nice to Maurienne on 30 July 1544, but there is no evidence that he was in Holy Orders or ever consecrated a bishop; he was named a cardinal on 19 December 1444, and appointed papal legate in the Romandiola on 26 August 1545, where he continued to serve under Pope Julius III, and Marcellus II, and Paul IV.

By the time of the Reformation, the cathedral Chapter possessed eleven parishes and were patrons of twenty-two others, as well as the hôpital de la Rochette and the priories of La Corbière, Aiton, and Saint-Julien.

On 23 August 1489, Bishop Etienne de Morel (1483–1499) solemnly invested Charles I, Duke of Savoy (1482–1490) as a canon of the cathedral of Maurienne. All subsequent dukes, with papal permission, were granted the same privilege, as though it were a hereditary possession. Emmanuel Philibert, Duke of Savoy, took solemn possession of a canonry in the cathedral of Maurienne in 1564.

==== Diocese of Maurienne in the mid-17th century ====
A major plague struck the diocese of Maurienne in 1630.

Before the appointment of Hercule Berzetti as bishop of Maurienne in 1658, Pope Alexander VII ordered Cardinal Antonio Barberini to provide a report on the state of the diocese and the suitability of the candidate. The report stated that in civil affairs the diocese was subject to the Dukes of Savoy, and in ecclesiastical matters to the metropolitan of Vienne. The cathedral, which was in need of extensive repairs, was administered by a Chapter of 18 canons, though it had no dignities, and there was no special provision for a theologus or penitentiarius. The canons were responsible for the spiritual care of the cathedral parish. The episcopal palace, which was near the cathedral, was in good repair. Besides the cathedral, there were two parishes in the city, a convent of men and one of women, and a hospice for pilgrims. There were around 100 parishes in the diocese, most of them so poor that the incumbent priest relied to an extent on alms.

=== Revolution, Repression ===
In 1792, Savoy was invaded and occupied by forces of the French National Assembly. Bishops and priests were ordered to swear a prescribed oath to the Civil Constitution of the Clergy, or to lose their offices; on 23 April 1792, Pope Pius VI ordered that any clergy who did swear the oaths were automatically suspended. Four of the five bishops then in office went into exile, including the bishop of Maurienne; the fifth was too aged to flee. Commissioners sent from Paris imposed a revolutionary government, and on 8 March 1793 issued an ecclesiastical decree which followed metropolitan French policy by reducing the number of dioceses from 5 to 1, to be centered in Annecy and called the diocese of Mont-Blanc. A new bishop for each diocese was to be elected by an assembly of electors chosen for loyalty to the French constitution. Electors did not have to be Catholic or even Christian. Papal participation in any form was forbidden. These arrangements were uncanonical and schismatic, as were the consecrations of any of the "Constitutional bishops."

On 29 November 1801, in the concordat of 1801 between the French Consulate, headed by First Consul Napoleon Bonaparte, and Pope Pius VII, the bishopric was suppressed, its territory being merged into the Diocese of Chambéry.

There was already a charity hospital in Maurienne by the 13th century, established and subsidized by the bishops. It had fallen into decay in the 15th century, and was revived in the 16th by the Confraternity of the Bienheureuse Vierge Marie de la Miséricorde. The agents of the French Revolution abolished both the confraternity and the diocese of Maurienne in 1801. The operation of the hospital was placed in the hands of nine administrators, including a lawyer, a physician, a surgeon, and a pharmacist; there was a staff of 14, for 28 sick and 9 orphans. In 1805, the administrators petitioned the Emperor Napoleon for assistance with their dilapidated building; he assigned them the former Major Seminary in Maurienne, which had been used as a military hospital by the French, and was in a bad sanitary condition. In 1821, the priest of the city wrote about the state of the hospice to his friend, who was the spiritual director of the Soeurs de Saint-Joseph-de-Chambéry, who were not able to respond immediately. In May 1822, the administrators made an official request of the sisters. In the first week of June, Mother St.-Jean of Chambéry and three other sisters took charge of the hospital. In November 1822, another sister was requested from Chambéry to organize a school for poor girls; the school opened in January 1824, and in January 1825 was authorized to accept paying students.

The papacy was already interested in stabilizing the establishment at Maurienne, and, in May 1824, Cardinal Giulio-Maria della Somaglia was engaged in negotiations with the bishop of Chambéry and with the archbishop of Lyon to make the sisters in Maurienne an independent congregation.

The Sisters of St. Joseph, a nursing and teaching order, with mother-house at St-Jean-de-Maurienne, are a branch of the Congregation of St. Joseph at Lyon. At the end of the nineteenth century, they were in charge of 8 day nurseries and 2 hospitals. In Algeria, the East Indies and Argentina houses were founded, controlled by the motherhouse at Maurienne.

=== Restoration ===
In the Treaty of Paris, signed on 30 May 1814, Chambéry became part of France. In the General Treaty of the Congress of Vienna, signed on 9 June 1815, the ancient boundaries of the Kingdom of Sardinia were restored. This act returned Maurienne to the control of King Charles Felix.

At the request of King Charles Felix of Sardinia and his ambassador at the Vatican, Giovanni Nicolao Ludovico Crosa, on 5 August 1825, with the papal bull "Ecclesias quae antiquitate", Pope Leo XII restored the Diocese of Saint-Jean-de-Maurienne with territory consisting of 80 parishes removed from the diocese of Chambéry. The parish church of S. John the Baptist was restored to cathedral status, and it was assigned a cathedral chapter consisting of three dignities (Provost, Archdeacon, and Cantor) and ten canons, two of whom would be the Theologus and the Penitentiarius. The right of the king to nominate a candidate for an episcopal vacancy, as well as a vacancy in the office of archdeacon and cantor, as well as the vacancy in a canonry (except for the theologus and penitentiarius) was confirmed or granted. The pope retained the right to nominate the provost. The restored diocese of Maurienne was made a suffragan of the archbishop of Chambéry.

Bishop Alexis Billiet was installed on 18 April 1826, and he immediately set to work to recover the diocese's rights and property, as well as to unify a clergy and people who had been thrown into confusion by the French occupation. He began the process of canonically separating the house of the Sisters of S.-Joseph from their mother-house in Chambéry, which was approved by King Charles Felix on 18 April 1827. In 1828, the Sisters signed a contract to purchase the château of the comtes d'Arves as a new mother-house.

=== Modern changes ===
In 1947, the diocese of Maurienne gained territory from the Metropolitan Archdiocese of Torino.

On 26 April 1966, Maurienne was suppressed as an independent diocese, its title and territory being merged into the renamed Metropolitan Archdiocese of Chambéry–Saint-Jean-de-Maurienne–Tarentaise.

== Devotion ==
Among the saints specially honoured in, or connected with, the diocese are:

- Aprus of Sens, a priest who founded a refuge for pilgrims and the poor in the Village of St. Avre (seventh century)
- Thomas of Maurienne, b. at Maurienne, d. in 720, famous for rebuilding the Abbey of Farfa, of which the third abbot, Lucerius, was also a native of Maurienne
- Marinus, monk of Chandor (monasterium candorense) in Maurienne, martyred by the Saracens (eighth century)
- Landry of Paris, pastor of Lanslevillard (eleventh century), drowned in the Arc during one of his apostolic journeys
- Bénézet (Benedict) (1165–84), born at Hermillon, a northern suburb of St.-Jean-de-Maurienne in the diocese, and founder of the guild of Fratres Pontifices of Avignon
- Cabert or Gabert, disciple of St. Dominic, who preached the Gospel for twenty years in the vicinity of AiguebelIe (thirteenth century)

The chief shrines of the diocese were:

- Notre Dame de Bonne Nouvelle, near St-Jean-de-Maurienne, which dates from the sixteenth century
- Notre Dame de Charmaix, in a mountain pass south of Modane
- Notre Dame de Beaurevers at Montaimon, dating from the seventeenth century.

== Bishops of Saint-Jean-de-Maurienne ==
=== To 1200 ===
- 579: Felmase I
- 581–602: Hiconius
- 650: Leporius
- 725: Walchinus
- c. 736 to 738: Emilian of Cogolla
- 773: Witgarius
- 837: Mainardus
- 855: Joseph
- 858: Abbo
- 876: Adalbert
- 887: Asmundus
- 899: Guillelmus
- c. 915 Benedict
- 916–926: Odilard
- 994–1035: Evrardus
- c. 1037–1060: Theobaldus
- 1060–1073: Burchardus
- 1075–1081: Artaud
- 1081–1116: Conon
- 1116–1124: Amédée de Faucigny
- 1124–1132: Conon II
- 1132–1146: Ayrald I
- 1146–1158: Bernard
- 1158–1162: Ayrald II
- 1162–1176: Guillaume II
- 1177: Peter
- 1177–1198: Lambert
- 1198–1200: Allevard

=== From 1200 to 1500 ===
- 1200–1211: Bernard de Chignin
- 1215 Amadeus of Geneva
- 1221–1223?: Joannes
- 1223?–1236: Aimar de Bernin
- 1236–1256: Amadeus of Savoy
- 1256–1261: Pierre de Morestel
- 1261–1269: Anthelmus de Clermont
- 1269–1273: Pierre de Guelis
- 1273–1301: Aymon (I) de Miolans
- 1302: Ayrald IV
- 1302–1308: Amblard d’Entremont (de Beaumont)
- 1308–1334: Aymon (II) de Miolans d’Hurtières
- 1334–1349: Anselm de Clermont
- 1349–1376: Amadeus of Savoy-Achaia
- 1376–1380: Jean Malabaylla
- 1380–1385: Henry de Severy
- 1385–1410: Savin de Floran
- 1410–1422: Amédée de Montmayeur
- 1422–1432: Aimon Gerbais
- 1433–1441: Oger Moriset
- 1441–1451: Cardinal Louis de La Palud
- 1451–1452: Cardinal Juan de Segovia
- 1453–1483: Cardinal Guillaume d'Estouteville
- 1483–1499: Etienne de Morel

=== From 1500 to 1800 ===
- 1499–1532: Louis de Gorrevod de Challand
- 1532–1544: Jean Philibert de Challant
- 1544–1559: Girolamo Recanati Capodiferro
- 1560–1563: Brandisius de Trottis

1564–1567: Ippolito d'Este Administrator

- 1567–1591: Pierre Lambert, O.S.A.
- 1591–1618: Philibeult François Milliet de Faverges
- 1618–1636: Charles Bobba
- 1640–1656: Paul Milliet de Challes

1656–1658: Sede vacante

- 1658–1686: Hercule Berzetti
- 1686–1736: François-Hyacinthe Valpergue de Masin, O.P.

1736–1741: Sede vacante

- 1741–1756: Ignace-Dominique Grisella de Rosignan
- 1757–1779: Charles Joseph Filippa de Martiniana
- 1780–1793: Charles-Joseph Compans de Brichanteau

François Molin, Vicar Capitular
Dominique Rogès, Vicar Capitular

=== Bishops of Chambéry, Geneva and Maurienne, from 1801 to 1825 ===
- 1802–1805: René des Monstiers de Mérinville
- 1805–1823: Irénée-Yves Desolle
- 1825–1840: Alexis Billiet

=== Bishops of Maurienne, from 1825 to 1996 ===
- 1840–1876: François-Marie Vibet
- 1876–1906: Michel Rosset
- 1906–1924: Adrien Alexis Fodéré
- 1924–1946: Auguste Grumel
- 1946–1954: Frédéric Duc
- 1954–1956: Louis Ferrand (also coadjutor archbishop of Tours)
- 1956–1960: Joël-André-Jean-Marie Bellec (also Bishop of Perpignan-Elne)
- 1961–1966: André Georges Bontemps

== See also ==
- List of Catholic dioceses in France
- Catholic Church in France

== Sources and external links ==
=== Episcopal lists ===
- Gams, Pius Bonifatius (1873). Series episcoporum Ecclesiae catholicae: quotquot innotuerunt a beato Petro apostolo. Ratisbon: Typis et Sumptibus Georgii Josephi Manz. pp. 548–549. (Use with caution; obsolete)
- Eubel, Conradus, ed. (1913). Hierarchia catholica (in Latin). Vol. 1 (Tomus I) (second ed.). Münster: Libreria Regensbergiana. (in Latin)
- Eubel, Conradus, ed. (1914). Hierarchia catholica (in Latin). Vol. 2 (Tomus II) (second ed.). Münster: Libreria Regensbergiana. archived
- Eubel, Conradus; Gulik, Guilelmus, eds. (1923). Hierarchia catholica (in Latin). Vol. 3 (Tomus III) (second ed.). Münster: Libreria Regensbergiana.
- Gauchat, Patritius (Patrice) (1935). Hierarchia catholica. Vol. 4 (Tomus IV) (1592–1667). Münster: Libraria Regensbergiana.
- Ritzler, Remigius; Sefrin, Pirminus (1952). Hierarchia catholica medii et recentis aevi. Vol. 5 (Tomus V) (1667–1730). Patavii: Messagero di S. Antonio.
- Ritzler, Remigius; Sefrin, Pirminus (1958). Hierarchia catholica medii et recentis aevi. Vol. 6 (Tomus VI) (1730–1799). Patavii: Messagero di S. Antonio.
- Ritzler, Remigius; Sefrin, Pirminus (1968). Hierarchia Catholica medii et recentioris aevi (in Latin). Vol. VII (1800–1846). Monasterii: Libreria Regensburgiana.
- Remigius Ritzler; Pirminus Sefrin (1978). Hierarchia catholica Medii et recentioris aevi (in Latin). Vol. VIII (1846–1903). Il Messaggero di S. Antonio.
- Pięta, Zenon (2002). Hierarchia catholica medii et recentioris aevi (in Latin). Vol. IX (1903–1922). Padua: Messagero di San Antonio. ISBN 978-88-250-1000-8.

=== Studies ===
- Besson, Joseph A. (1759). Mémoires pour l'histoire ecclésiastique des diocèses de Genève, Tarantaise, Aoste et Maurienne. (in French). Nancy: Sebastien Hénault, 1759. (pp. 282–309)
- Billiet, Alexis (1861) Mémoires sur les premiers évêques du diocèse de Maurienne Chambéry: Puthod (fils), 1861.
- Billiet, Alexis; Albrieux, Canon (edd.) (1861). Chartes du diocèse de Maurienne: Documents recueillis. (in Latin and French). Chambéry: Puthod fils, 1861.
- Billiet, Alexis (1865). Mémoires pour servir à l'histoire ecclésiastique du diocèse de Chambéry. (in French). Chambéry: F. Puthod, 1865.
- Buet, Charles *1867). "Étude sur les droits seigneuriaux des évêques de Maurienne," (in French), in: Travaux de la Société d'histoire et d'archéologie de la Maurienne (Savoie), Vol. 2 (Chambéry: F. Puthod 1867), pp. 71–97.
- Duchesne, Louis (1907). Fastes épiscopaux de l'ancienne Gaule. (in French). Vol. I., second edition. Paris 1907. (pp. 239–242)
- Hauréau, Jean-Barthélemy (1865). Gallia christiana. (in Latin). vol. XVI, Paris 1865. (coll. 611-654)
- Pisani, Paul (1907). Répertoire biographique de l'épiscopat constitutionnel (1791-1802) (in French). Paris: A. Picard et fils.
- Poole, Reginald L. (1916). "The See of Maurienne and the Valley of Susa," in: English Historical Review 31 (1916), pp. 1–19.
- Savio, Fedele (1899). Gli antichi vescovi d'Italia. Il Piemonte. (in Italian). Torino: Fratelli Bocca 1899. (pp. 221–237)
- Truchet, Saturnin (1867). Histoire hagiologique du diocèse de Maurienne. (in French). Chambéry: F. Puthod, 1867.
- Truchet, Saturnin (1887). Saint-Jean de Maurienne au XVIe siècle. (in French). Chambéry: Impr. Savoisienne, 1887.

=== External links ===
- Chow, Gabriel GCatholic, with Google satellite photo
- Goyau, Georges. "Saint Jean de Maurienne." The Catholic Encyclopedia Volume XIII (New York: Robert Appleton 1913), pp. 353–354.
